= Iliac vessels =

In human anatomy, iliac vessels are the following arteries and veins located in the pelvis:

== Arteries ==
- Common iliac artery, forms at terminus of the aorta
- External iliac artery, two major arteries which bifurcate off the common iliac artery
- Internal iliac artery, the main artery of the pelvis

== Veins ==
- Common iliac vein, formed by the external and internal iliac veins, drains into the inferior vena cava
- Deep circumflex iliac vein, formed by the union of the venae comitantes of the deep iliac circumflex artery, and joins the external iliac vein
- External iliac vein, terminates at the common iliac vein, drains the femoral vein
- Internal iliac vein, terminates at the common iliac vein, drains pelvic organs and perineum
- Superficial circumflex iliac vein

== See also ==
- Ileal arteries
