= Circumflex iliac artery =

Circumflex iliac artery may refer to:

- Deep circumflex iliac artery
- Superficial circumflex iliac artery
