= Femoral sheath =

Anatomical structure of the upper thigh

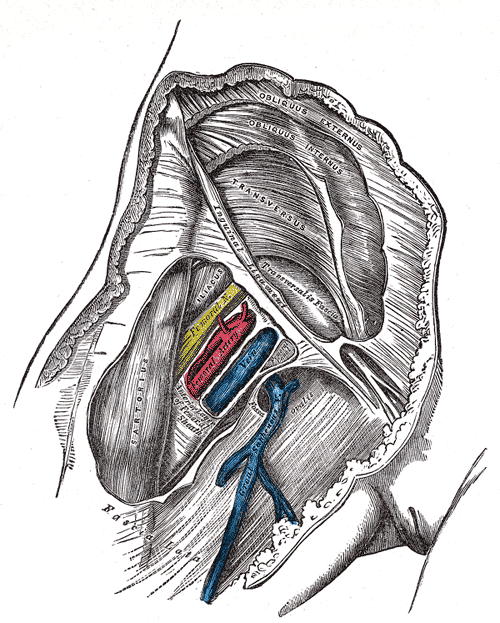
- Femoral sheath laid open to show its three compartments.

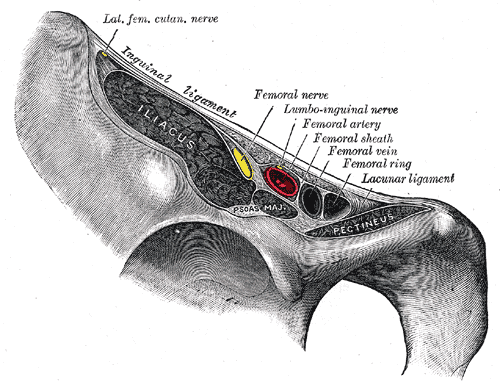
- Structures passing behind the inguinal ligament.

Details

Identifiers
- Latin: vagina femoralis
- TA2: 2697

The femoral sheath (also called the crural sheath) is a funnel-shaped downward extension of abdominal fascia within which the femoral artery and femoral vein pass between the abdomen and the thigh. The femoral sheath is subdivided by two vertical partitions to form three compartments (medial, intermediate, and lateral); the medial compartment is known as the femoral canal and contains lymphatic vessels and a lymph node, whereas the intermediate canal and the lateral canal accommodate the femoral vein and the femoral artery (respectively). Some neurovascular structures perforate the femoral sheath. Topographically, the femoral sheath is contained within the femoral triangle.

== Structure ==
The femoral sheath is funnel-shaped fascial structure, with the wide end directed superior-ward. The femoral sheath is formed by an inferior-ward prolongation - posterior to the inguinal ligament - of abdominal fascia, with transverse fascia being continued down anterior to the femoral vessels, and iliac fascia posterior to these. The femoral sheath is strengthened anteriorly by the iliopubic tract. The narrowed inferior/distal end of the femoral sheath concludes by blending with the tunica adventitia of the femoral vessels about 4 cm inferior to the inguinal ligament.

The lateral wall of the sheath is vertical and is perforated by the lumboinguinal nerve; the medial wall is directed/oriented obliquely inferolaterally and is perforated by the great saphenous vein, and by lymphatic vessel.

The femoral sheath is contained in the femoral triangle.

=== Compartments and contents ===
The sheath is divided by two vertical partitions which stretch between its anterior and posterior walls:

- The (smallest) medial compartment is named the femoral canal, and contains some lymphatic vessels and a lymph gland embedded in a small amount of areolar tissue.
- The intermediate compartment contains the femoral vein.
- The lateral compartment contains the femoral artery.

== Function ==
The femoral sheath allows for the femoral artery and the femoral vein to pass between the abdomen and the thigh.

== Additional images ==
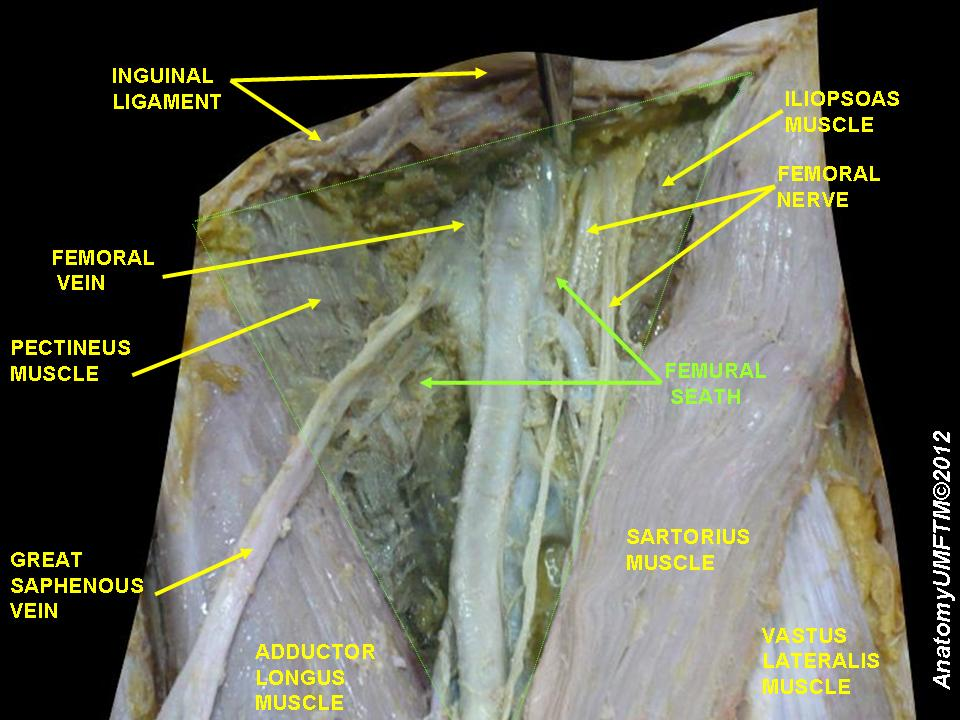
Femoral sheath
