= Superficial circumflex iliac vein =

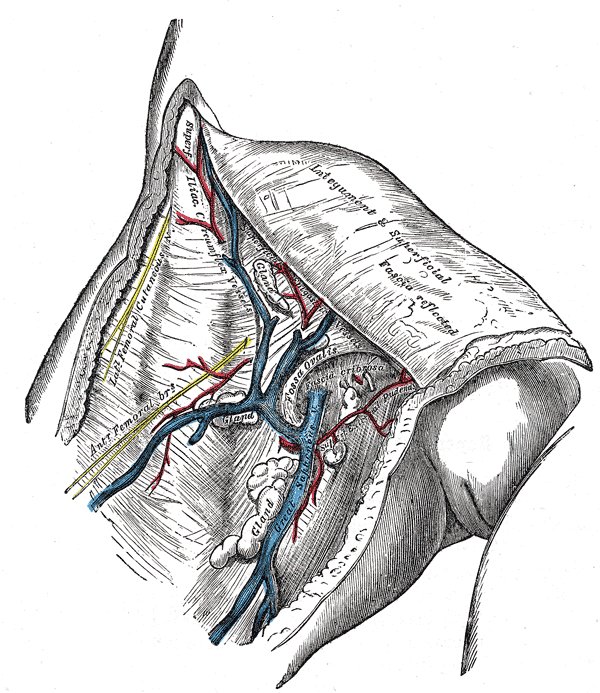

Details
- Drains to: Great saphenous vein
- Artery: Superficial circumflex iliac artery

Identifiers
- Latin: vena circumflexa ilium profunda
- TA98: A12.3.11.005
- TA2: 5066
- FMA: 44319

Superficial circumflex iliac vein is either of the two venae comitantes of the superficial circumflex iliac artery. It usually empties into the great saphenous vein just proximal to where it itself empties into the femoral vein, but may sometimes instead empty into the femoral vein directly. Passing in the subcutaneous tissue, the SCIV runs superficially/anteriorly across the femoral artery.

== Additional images ==
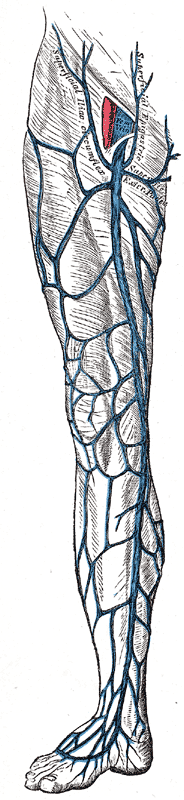
The great saphenous vein and its tributaries.

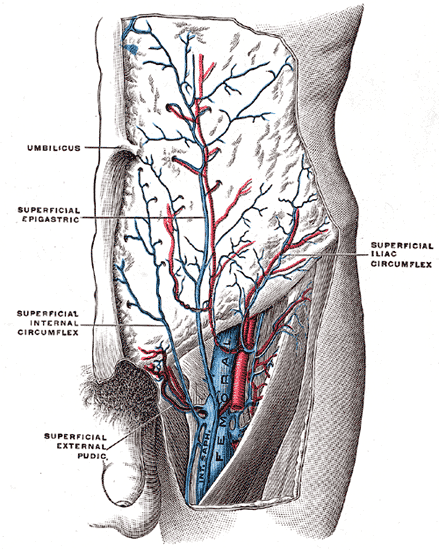
The femoral vein and its tributaries.

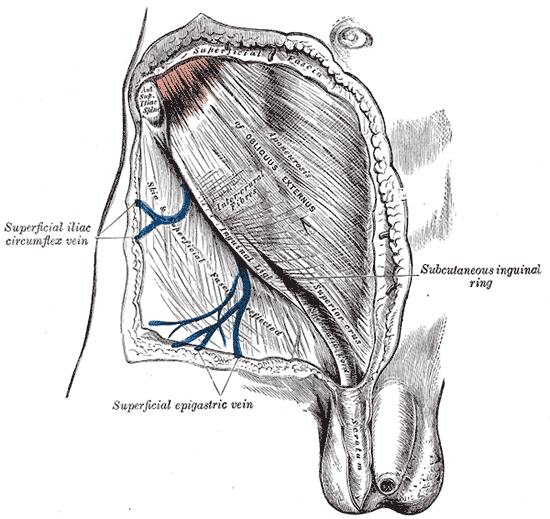
The subcutaneous inguinal ring.

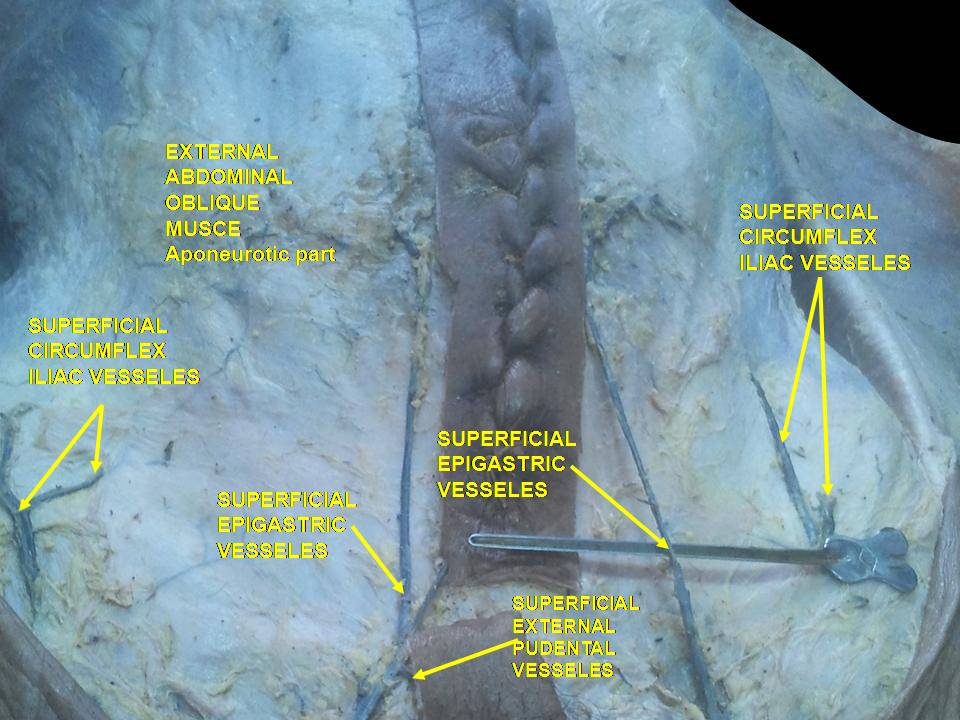
Anterior abdominal wall. Superficial dissection. Anterior view.
