= Adductor canal =

Aponeurotic tunnel in the middle third of the thigh

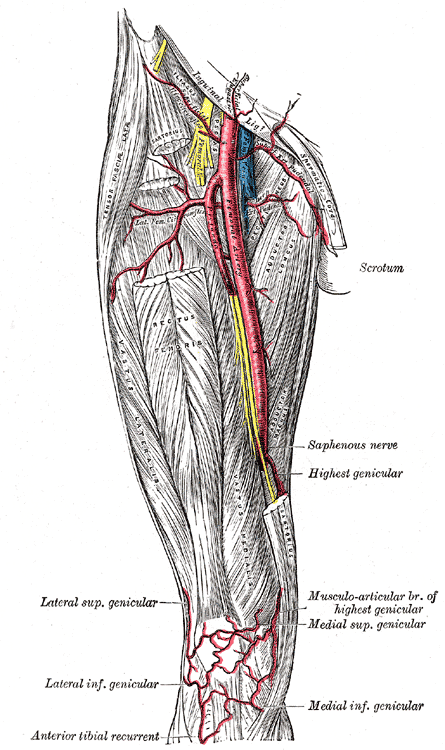
- The femoral artery. (Canal not labeled, but region visible at center right.)

- Cross-section through the middle of the thigh (the right thigh if seen from below)

Details

Identifiers
- Latin: canalis adductorius
- TA98: A04.7.03.006
- TA2: 2611
- FMA: 58781

The adductor canal (also known as the subsartorial canal or Hunter's canal) is an aponeurotic tunnel in the middle third of the thigh giving passage to parts of the femoral artery, vein, and nerve. It extends from the apex of the femoral triangle to the adductor hiatus.

== Structure ==
The adductor canal extends from the apex of the femoral triangle to the adductor hiatus. It is an intermuscular cleft situated on the medial aspect of the middle third of the anterior compartment of the thigh, and has the following boundaries:

- medial wall - sartorius
- posterior wall - adductor longus and adductor magnus
- anterior wall - vastus medialis

It is covered by a strong aponeurosis which extends from the vastus medialis, across the femoral vessels to the adductor longus and magnus. Lying on the aponeurosis is the sartorius (tailor's) muscle.

=== Contents ===
The canal contains the femoral artery, femoral vein, and branches of the femoral nerve (specifically, the saphenous nerve, and the nerve to the vastus medialis). The femoral artery with its vein and the saphenous nerve enter this canal through the superior foramen. Then, the saphenous nerve and artery and vein of genus descendens exit through the anterior foramen, piercing the vastoadductor intermuscular septum. Finally, the femoral artery and vein exit via the inferior foramen (usually called the hiatus) through the inferior space between the oblique and medial heads of adductor magnus.

== Clinical significance ==
The saphenous nerve may be compressed in the adductor canal. The adductor canal may be accessed for a saphenous nerve block, often used to treat pain caused by this compression.

== History ==
The eponym "Hunter's canal" is named for John Hunter.

== Additional images ==
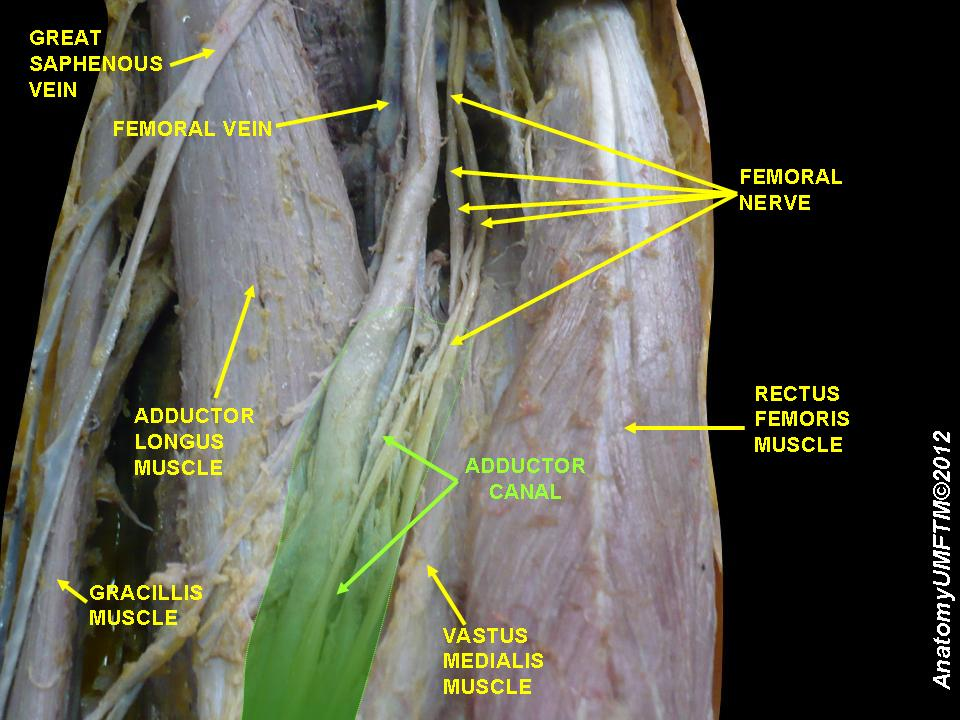
Adductor canal

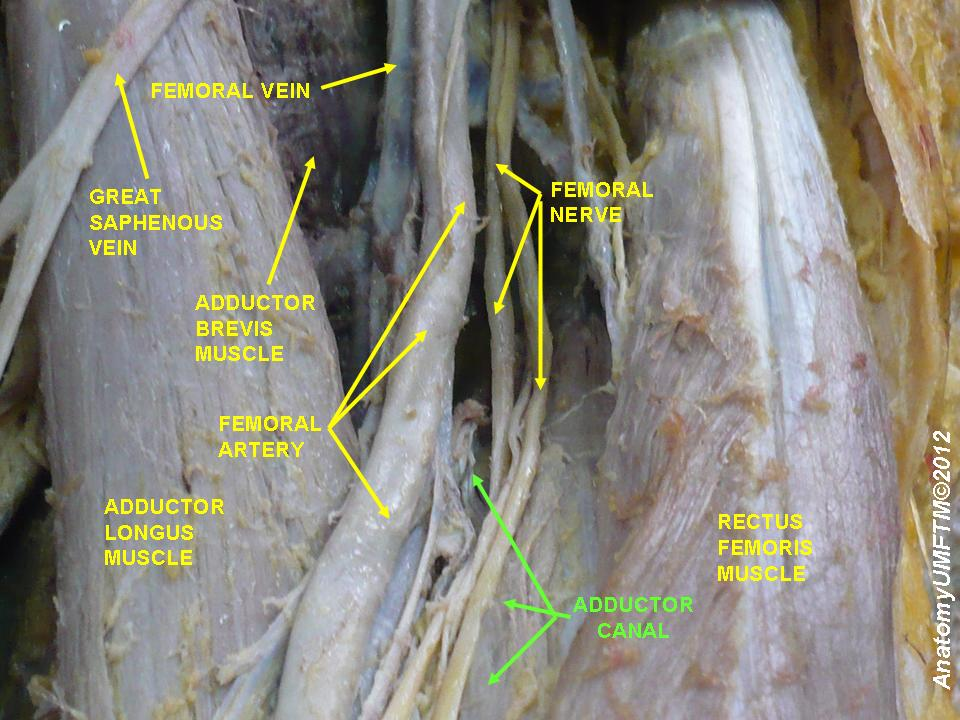
Adductor canal
