= DCIA =

DCIA may refer to:

- Director of the Central Intelligence Agency
- Deep circumflex iliac artery
- Dependent converging instrument approach, a form of instrument approach in aviation
