= Triangle of Doom =

Anatomical area in the human groin

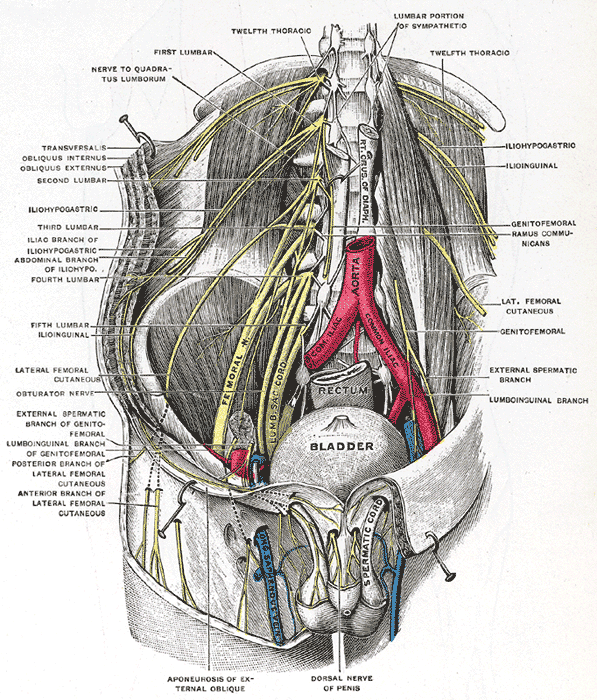
Deep and superficial dissection of the lumbar plexus.

The Triangle of Doom is an anatomical triangle defined by the vas deferens medially, gonadal vessel laterally and peritoneum inferiorly. This triangle contains external iliac artery and vein, the deep circumflex iliac vein, the genital branch of genitofemoral nerve and hidden by fascia, the femoral nerve. It bears significance in laparoscopic repair of groin hernia. Surgical staples are avoided here.

Similarly, the Triangle of Pain is an important landmark in laproscopic surgery. The boundaries are: the gonadal vessels (testicular artery and vein) medially, the iliopubic tract superiorly and the peritoneal reflection below. Contents of this triangle include the femoral branch of the genitofemoral nerve, and the Lateral cutaneous nerve of the thigh. After placing the mesh, the surgeon must avoid putting tacks to secure the mesh below the iliopubic tract, or it can injure the nerves. Hence the name 'Triangle of Pain'.
