= Adductor hiatus =

Gap between the adductor magnus muscle and the femur

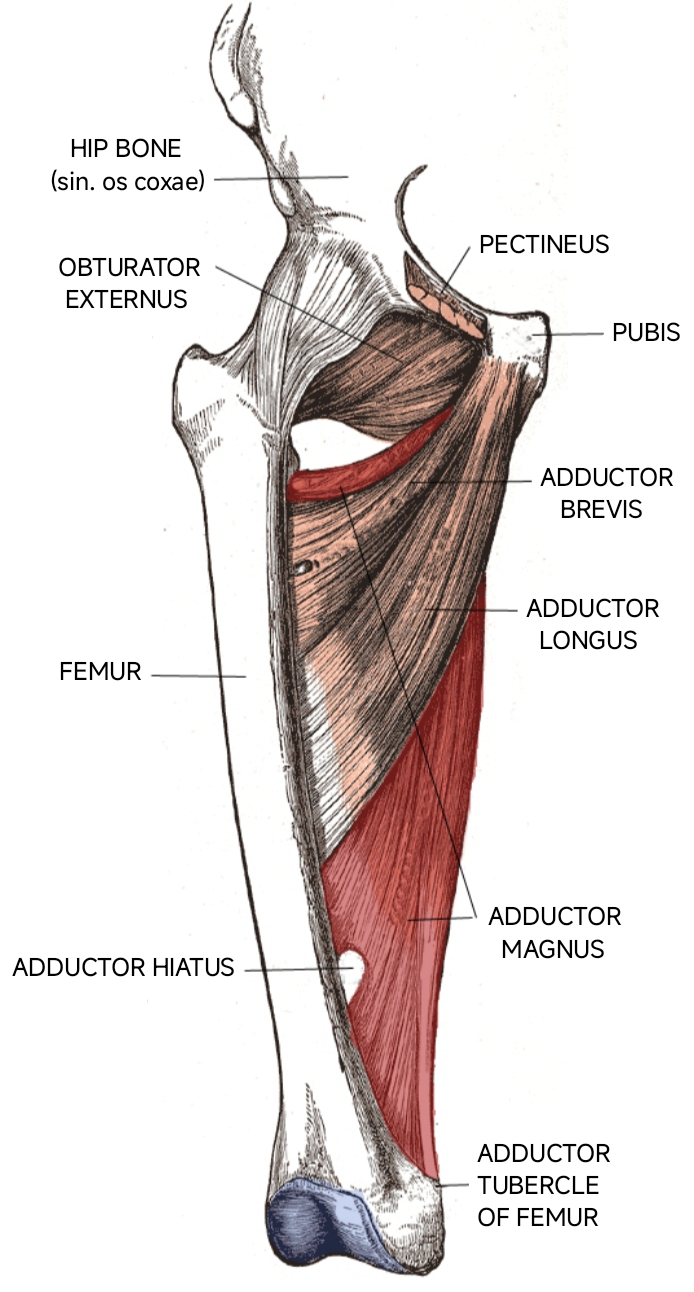
- Deep muscles of the medial femoral region. (Adductor hiatus visible as hole in adductor magnus at lower left.)

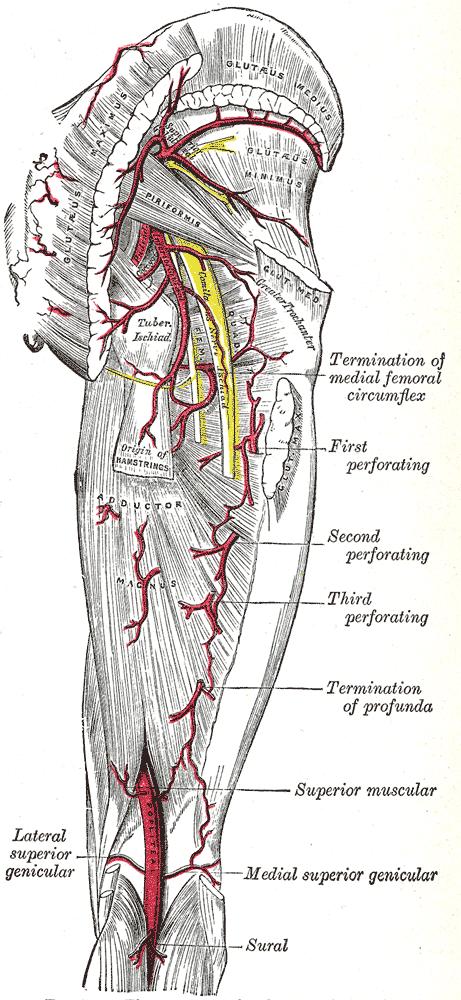
- The arteries of the gluteal and posterior femoral regions. (Adductor hiatus is not labeled, but popliteal artery is visible at bottom center.)

Details

Identifiers
- Latin: hiatus adductorius
- TA98: A04.7.03.008
- TA2: 2634
- FMA: 58784

In human anatomy, the adductor hiatus also known as hiatus magnus is a hiatus (gap) between the adductor magnus muscle and the femur that allows the passage of the femoral vessels from the anterior thigh to the posterior thigh and then the popliteal fossa. It is the termination of the adductor canal and lies about 8–13.5 cm (3.1–5.3 in) superior to the adductor tubercle.

== Structure ==
Kale et al. classified the adductor hiatus according to its shape and the structures surrounding. An adductor hiatus is described as oval or bridging depending on the shape of the upper boundary. It can also be described as muscular or fibrous depending on whether the structure surrounding is the muscular part or the tendinous part of the adductor magnus muscle. For example, the top drawing on the right shows an oval fibrous type of adductor hiatus, and the bottom one shows a bridging muscular adductor hiatus.

Four structures are associated with the adductor hiatus. However, only two structures enter and then leave through the hiatus; namely the femoral artery and femoral vein. Those vessels become the popliteal vessels (popliteal artery and popliteal vein) immediately after they leave the hiatus, where they form a network of anastomoses called the genicular arteries. The genicular arteries supply the knee joint.

The other two structures that are associated with the adductor hiatus are the descending genicular artery and the saphenous nerve. The saphenous nerve does not leave through the adductor hiatus but penetrates superficially halfway through the adductor canal.

== Clinical significance ==
=== Fracture of distal femur ===
Fracture at the supracondylar area of femur, where the adductor part of the adductor magnus attaches, will most likely cause damage to the femoral artery and may cause impairment of the blood supply to the lower leg. Popliteal artery can also be damaged by the fracture of distal femur.

=== Popliteal artery entrapment syndrome ===
Abnormality in the relationship between the adductor hiatus and the popliteal artery can also contribute to a condition called popliteal artery entrapment syndrome.

== Additional images ==
Schema of the arteries arising from the external iliac and femoral arteries.

Adductor hiatus is seen as hole in the adductor magnus.

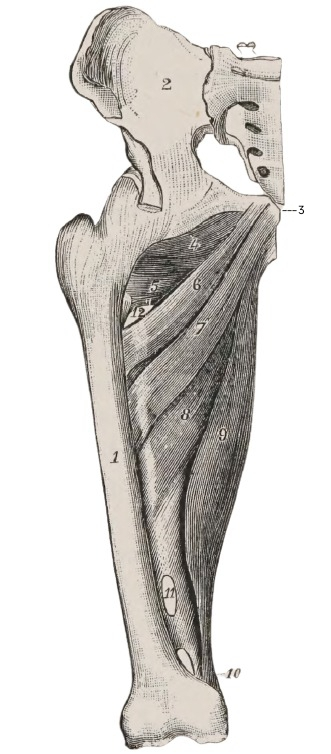
All three adductor muscles and nearby bones. Adductor hiatus is labeled 11. Right side. Anterior view. (After Hughes.)
