= Hiatus (anatomy) =

In anatomy, a hiatus is a natural fissure in a structure. Examples include:

- Adductor hiatus
- Aortic hiatus
- Esophageal hiatus, the opening in the diaphragm through which the esophagus passes from the thorax into the abdomen
- Greater petrosal nerve hiatus
- Maxillary hiatus
- Sacral hiatus
- Semilunar hiatus
- Urogenital hiatus
