= Superficial circumflex iliac artery =

Artery

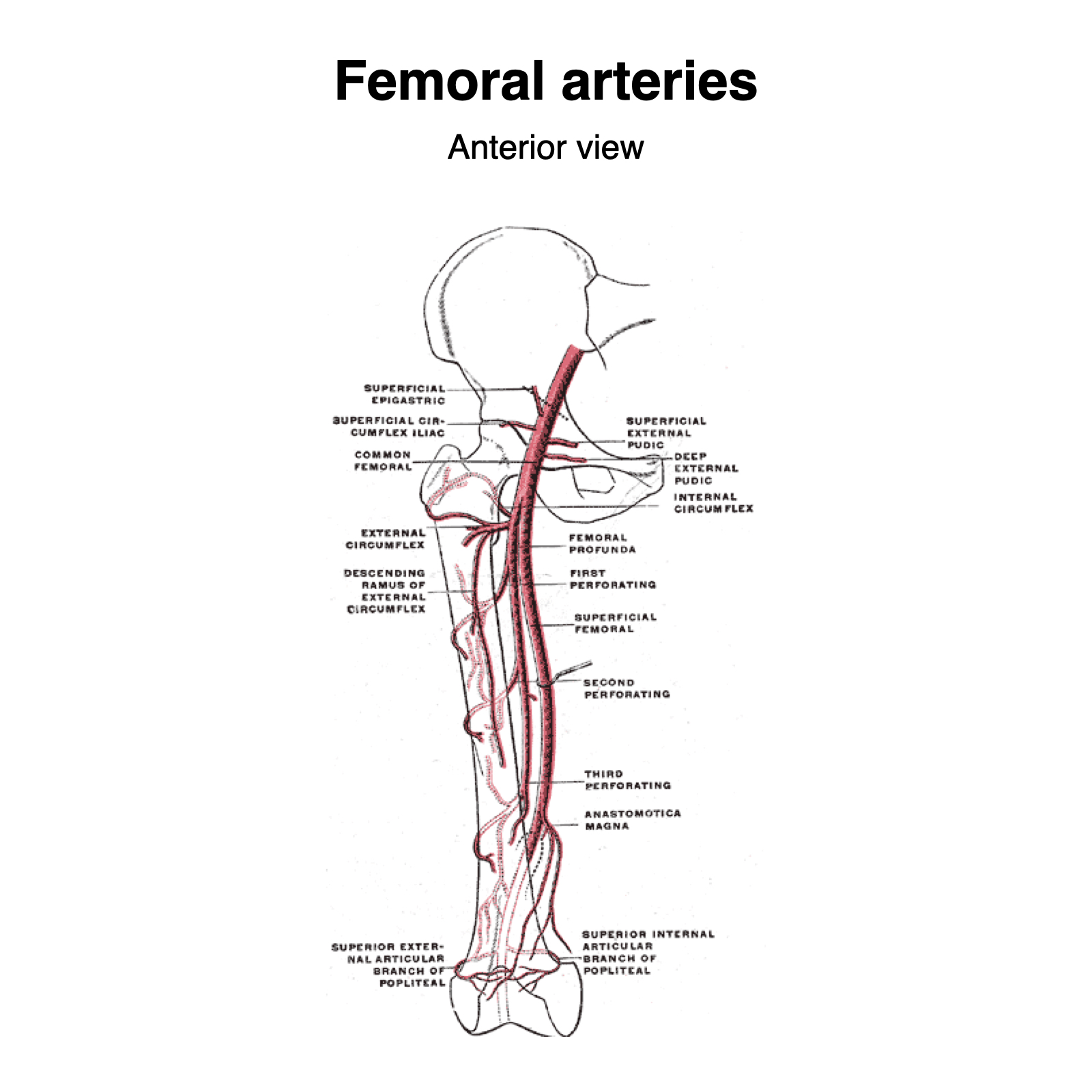
- Superficial circumflex iliac labeled at upper left.

Details
- Source: Femoral artery

Identifiers
- Latin: arteria circumflexa iliaca superficialis
- TA98: A12.2.16.012
- TA2: 4676
- FMA: 20737

The superficial iliac circumflex artery (or superficial circumflex iliac), the smallest of the cutaneous branches of the femoral artery, arises close to the superficial epigastric artery, and, piercing the fascia lata, runs lateralward, parallel with the inguinal ligament, as far as the crest of the ilium.

It divides into branches which supply the integument of the groin, the superficial fascia, and the superficial subinguinal lymph glands, anastomosing with the deep iliac circumflex, the superior gluteal and lateral femoral circumflex arteries.

In 45% to 50% of persons the superficial circumflex iliac artery and superficial inferior epigastric artery arise from a common trunk. In contrast, 40% to 45% of persons have a superficial circumflex iliac artery and superficial inferior epigastric artery that arise from separate origins.

== Additional images ==
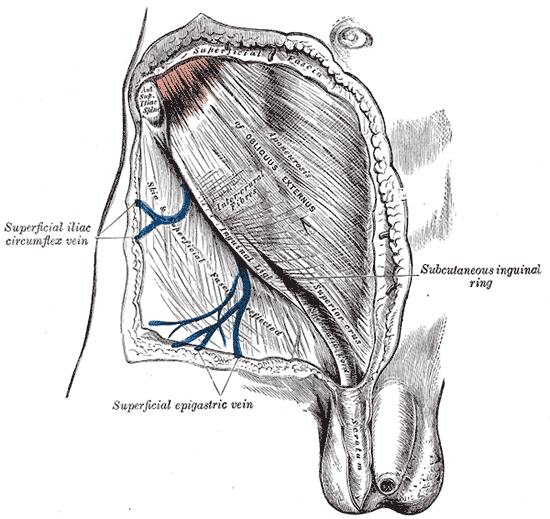
The subcutaneous inguinal ring.

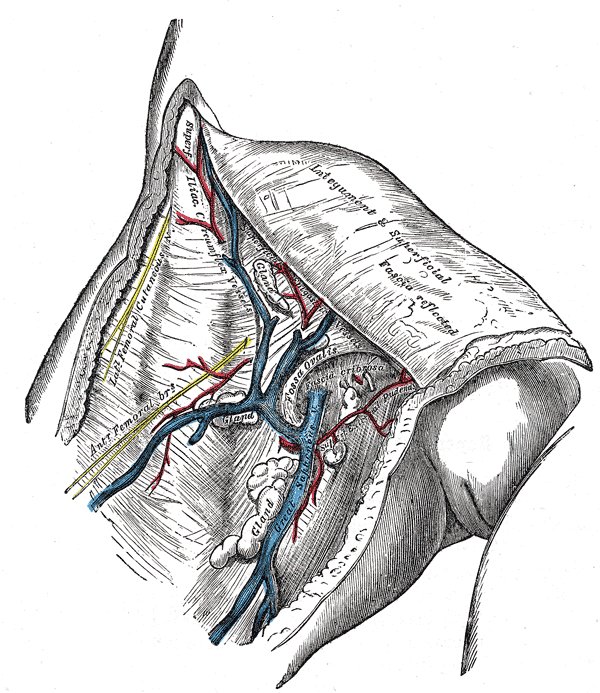
The great saphenous vein and its tributaries at the fossa ovalis.

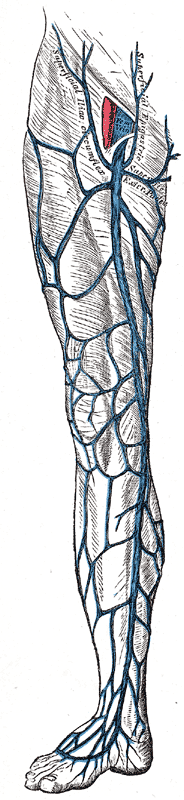
The great saphenous vein and its tributaries.

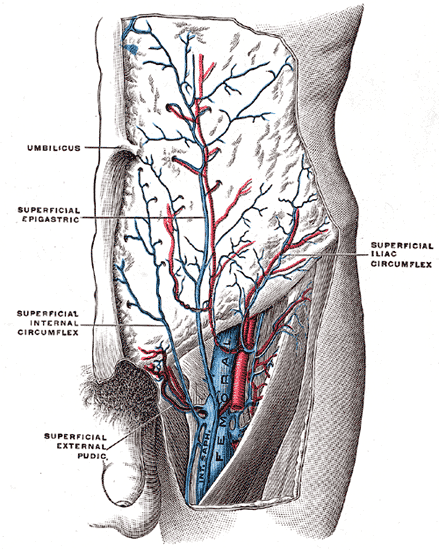
The femoral vein and its tributaries.

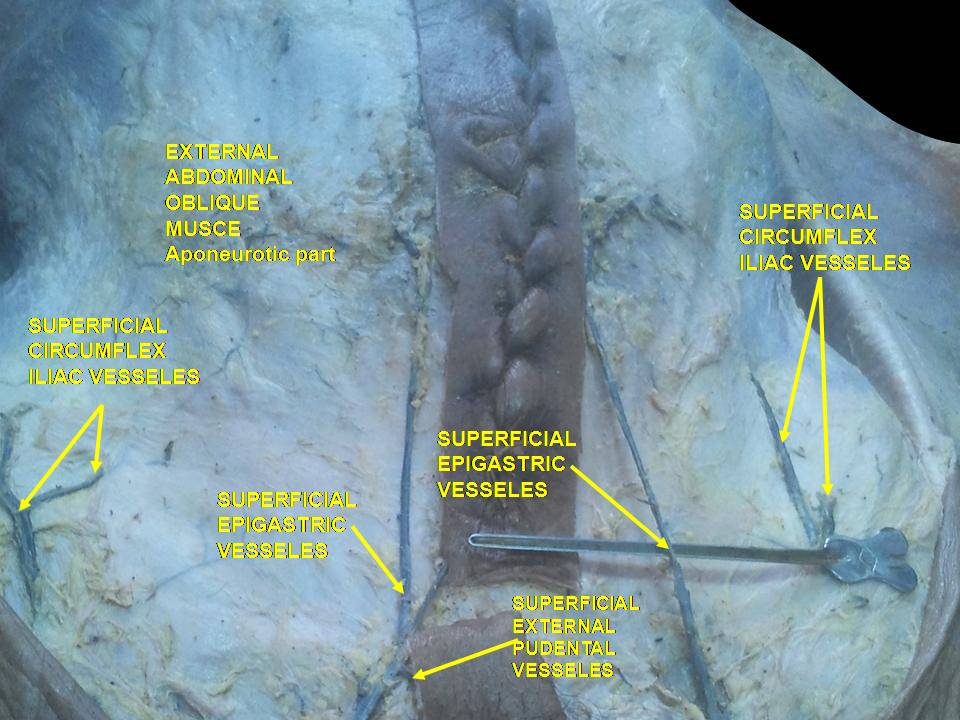
Anterior abdominal wall. Superficial dissection. Anterior view.
