= Deep femoral vein =

Large blood vessel

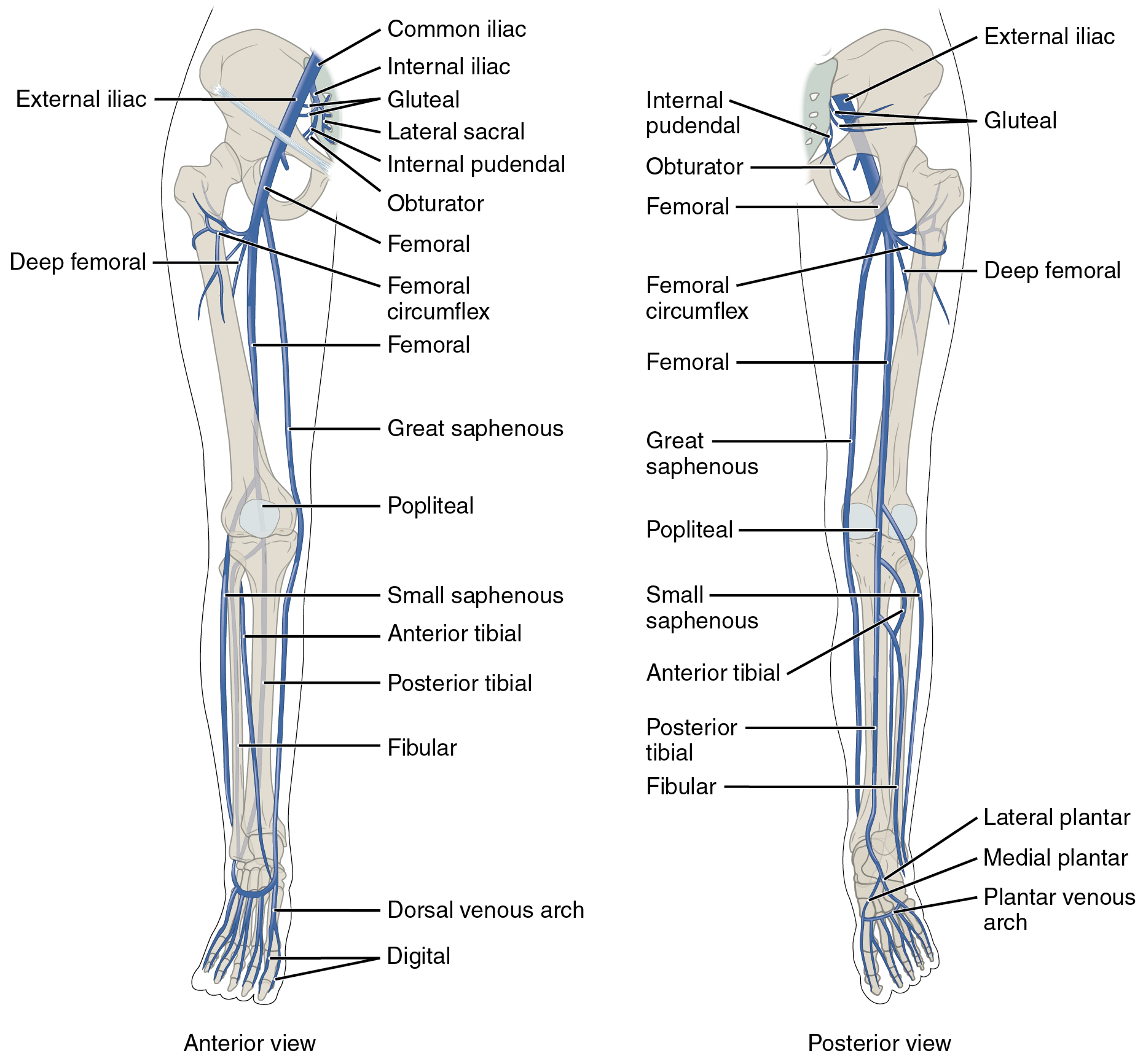
- Veins of the leg, with deep femoral vein near top.

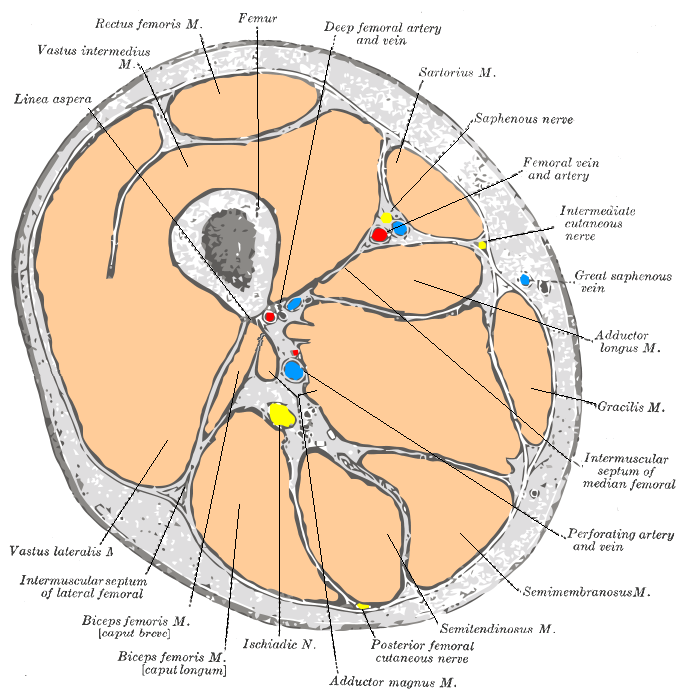
- Cross-section through the middle of the thigh. (Deep femoral artery and vein labeled at center top.)

Details
- Drains to: Femoral vein
- Artery: Profunda femoris artery

Identifiers
- Latin: vena profunda femoris
- TA98: A12.3.11.024
- TA2: 5070
- FMA: 51041

The deep femoral vein, deep vein of the thigh or profunda femoris vein is a large deep vein in the thigh. It collects blood from the inner thigh, passing superiorly and medially alongside the deep femoral artery before emptying into the femoral vein.

== Anatomy ==
=== Fate ===
The deep femoral vein drains into the femoral vein at approximately the level of the inferior-most portion of the ischial tuberosity.

== Function ==
The deep femoral vein drains the inner thigh. It contributes the largest volume of blood entering the femoral vein.

== Clinical significance ==
The deep femoral vein is commonly affected by phlebitis which can be a dangerous condition in the case of a thrombus, or blood clot, forming, as the thrombus may dislodge and travel to the lungs, causing pulmonary embolism. Risk factors for deep vein thrombosis include prolonged bed rest following surgery, immobility due to disability or fracture, an excessively sedentary lifestyle or hereditary dispositions such as the factor V Leiden mutation.
