= Femoral triangle =

Anatomical region of the thigh

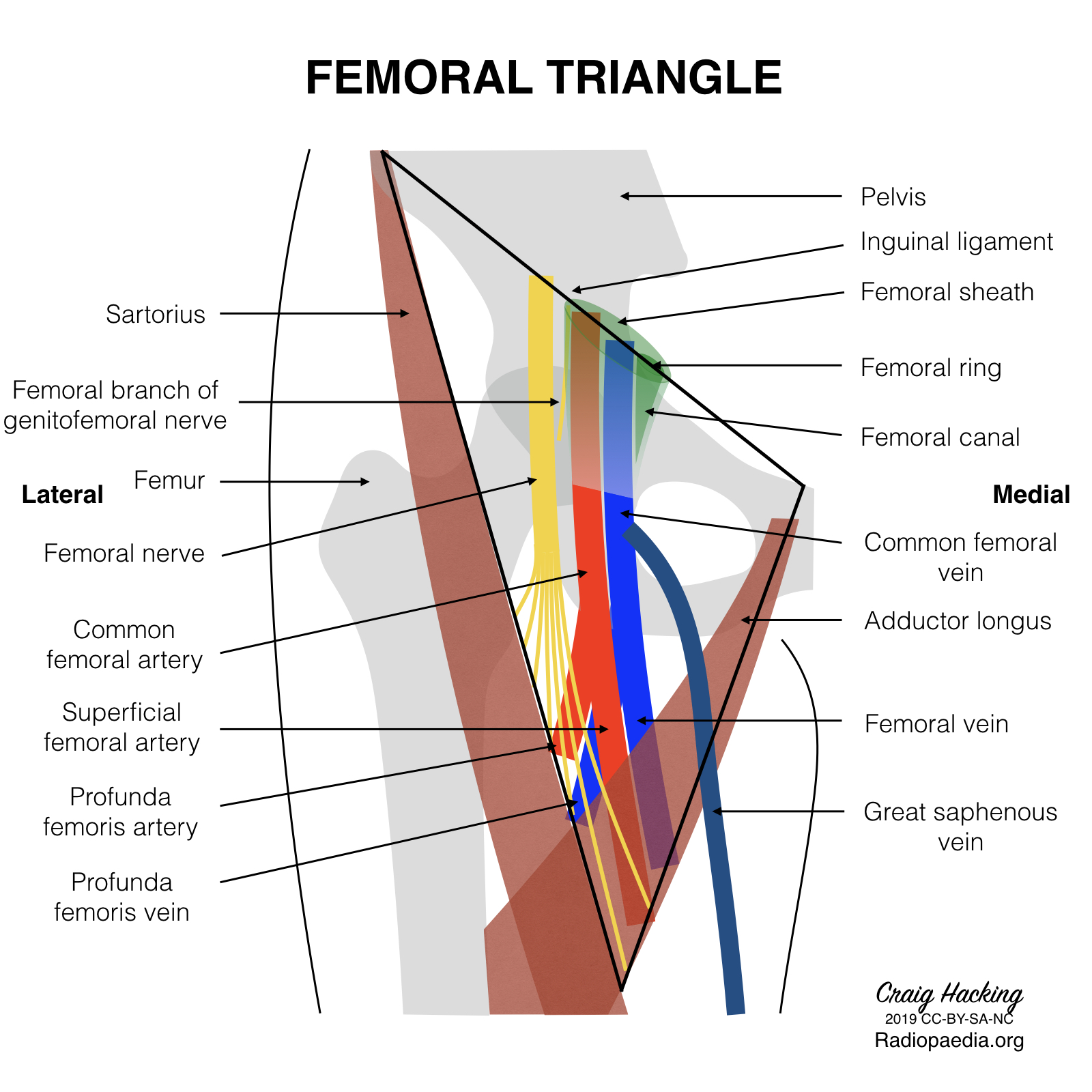
- Femoral triangle showing included blood vessels and nerves

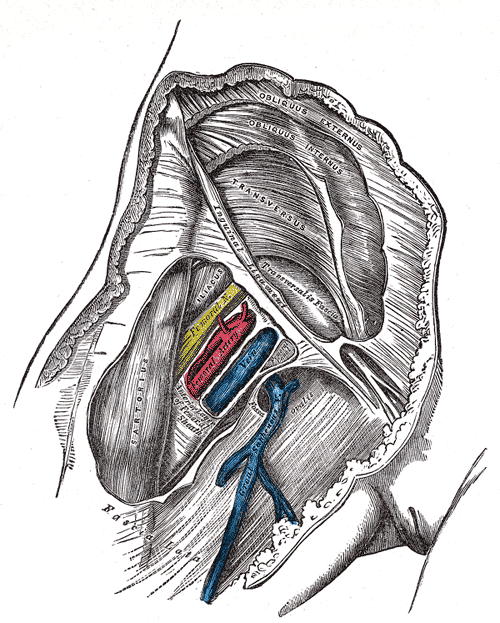
- Right femoral sheath laid open to show its three compartments

Details

Identifiers
- Latin: trigonum femorale
- TA98: A01.2.08.008
- TA2: 319

The femoral triangle (or Scarpa's triangle) is an anatomical region of the upper third of the thigh. It is a subfascial space which appears as a triangular depression below the inguinal ligament when the thigh is flexed, abducted and laterally rotated.

== Structure ==
The femoral triangle is bounded:

- superiorly (also known as the base) by the inguinal ligament.
- medially by the medial border of the adductor longus muscle. (Some people consider the femoral triangle to be smaller hence the medial border being at the lateral border of the adductor longus muscle.)
- laterally by the medial border of the sartorius muscle.

The apex of the triangle is continuous with the adductor canal. The roof is formed by the skin, superficial fascia, and deep fascia (fascia lata). The superficial fascia contains the superficial inguinal lymph nodes, femoral branch of the genitofemoral nerve, branches of the ilioinguinal nerve, superficial branches of the femoral artery with accompanying veins, and upper part of the great saphenous vein. The deep fascia has a saphenous opening and the opening is covered by the cribiform fascia.

Its floor is formed by the pectineus and adductor longus muscles medially and iliacus and psoas major muscle laterally.

=== Contents ===
Video of relevant anatomy

The femoral triangle is important as a number of vital structures pass through it, right under the skin. The following structures are contained within the femoral triangle (from lateral to medial):

- Lateral cutaneous nerve of thigh - It crosses the lateral angle of the triangle, runs on the lateral side of the thigh and ends by dividing into anterior and posterior branches. The anterior branch supplies the anterolateral aspect of the thigh while the lateral branch supplies the lateral aspect of the gluteal region.
- Femoral nerve and its terminal branches - The nerve enters the femoral triangle by passing beneath the inguinal ligament, just lateral to the femoral artery. In the thigh, the nerve lies in a groove between iliacus muscle and psoas major muscles, outside the femoral sheath, and lateral to the femoral artery. After a short course of about 4 cm in the thigh, the nerve is divided into anterior and posterior divisions, separated by lateral femoral circumflex artery.
- Nerve to pectineus - This nerve arises from the femoral nerve just above the inguinal ligament. It passes behind the femoral sheath to reach the anterior surface of the pectineus muscle.

Femoral sheath encloses the upper 4 cm of the femoral vessels. Its contents are shown below (from lateral to medial):

- Femoral branch of the genitofemoral nerve - occupies the lateral compartment of the femoral sheath along with femoral artery. It supplies the skin over the femoral triangle.
- Femoral artery and its branches - It emerges from the base of the femoral triangle at the mid-inguinal point (midpoint between the anterior superior iliac spine and the pubic symphysis of the pelvic bone) and exits through the apex of the triangle into the adductor canal.
- Femoral vein and its tributaries - The vein lies medial to the femoral artery at the base of the triangle but as it approaches the apex of the triangle, it lies posteromedially to the femoral artery. It receives drainage from great saphenous vein, circumflex veins, and veins corresponding to the branches of the femoral artery here.
- Deep inguinal lymph nodes - It lies deep to the deep fascia, medial to the upper part of the femoral vein, inside the femoral canal (medial compartment of the femoral sheath). Cloquet's node (also known as Rosenmuller's node) also lies in this canal. It receives lymphatic drainage from superficial inguinal lymph nodes, lymphatic drainage from the glans penis or clitoris, and from the deep lymphatics of the lower limb.

== Clinical significance ==
This area contains the superficial and deep lymphatic basins (groups) of the inguinal lymph nodes, and is the location targeted in an inguinal lymphadenectomy. The basins are separated by the fascia lata. For patients with palpable nodal disease, removal of the superficial and deep basins are recommended. In a patient with a positive sentinel lymph node biopsy, generally only the superficial nodes are removed, unless Cloquet's node (the most superior of the deep nodes) is clinically positive.

== Additional images ==
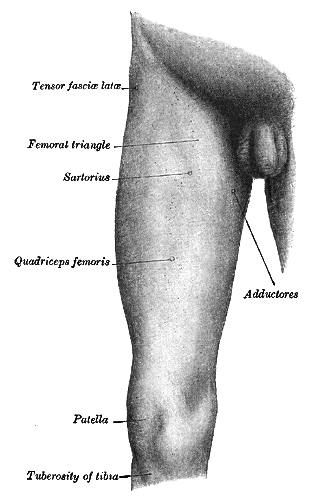
Front and medial aspect of right thigh.

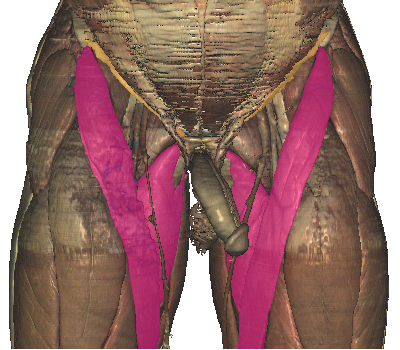
Borders of the femoral triangle of the Visible Human Male.

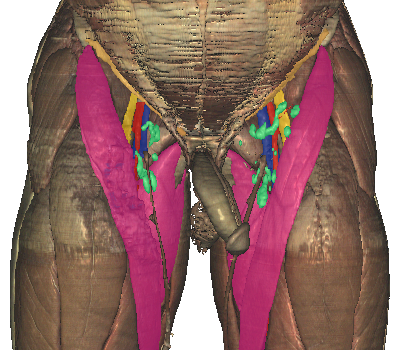
Contents of the femoral triangle of the Visible Human Male.
