= Mid-inguinal point =

Reference point for the abdomen

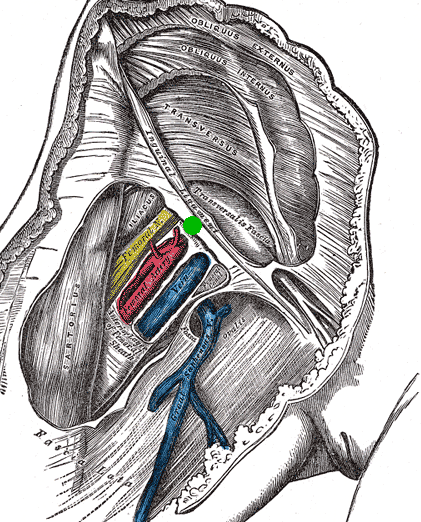
Mid-inguinal point, marked in green

The mid-inguinal point (MIP) is located at the middle point of an imaginary line drawn between the anterior superior iliac spine (ASIS) and the pubic symphysis. The mid-inguinal point is superior to (above) the inguinal ligament, and should not to be confused with the midpoint of the inguinal ligament itself, which is located halfway between the anterior superior iliac spine and the pubic tubercle.

== Significance ==
The external iliac artery becomes the femoral artery when it passes deep to the inguinal ligament, at the mid-inguinal point. As such, the point is along the superior boundary of the femoral triangle.
