= Deep circumflex iliac vein =

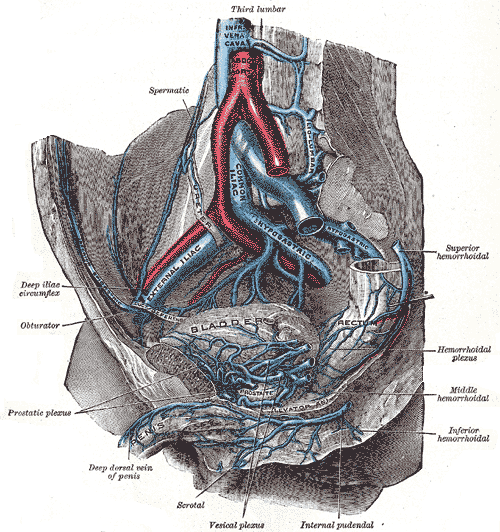
- The veins of the right half of the male pelvis.

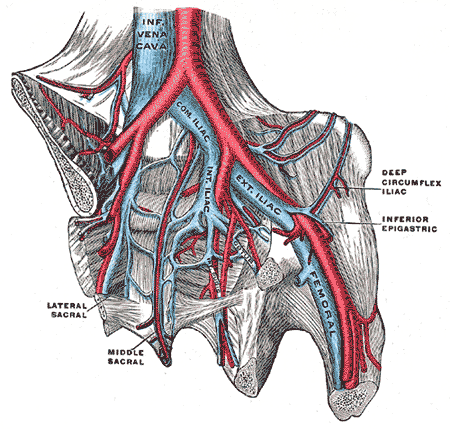
- The iliac veins.

Details
- Drains to: External iliac vein
- Artery: Deep circumflex iliac artery

Identifiers
- Latin: vena circumflexa ilium profunda
- TA98: A12.3.10.027
- TA2: 5054
- FMA: 21182

The deep circumflex iliac vein is formed by the union of the venae comitantes of the deep iliac circumflex artery. It drains venous blood from the walls of the iliac fossa. It empties into the external iliac vein about 2 cm superior to the inguinal ligament, just distal to where the inferior epigastric vein does so. The DCIV runs across the external iliac artery. It forms anastomoses with the iliolumbar vein, and lower two lumbar veins.
