= Femoral artery =

Large artery in the thigh

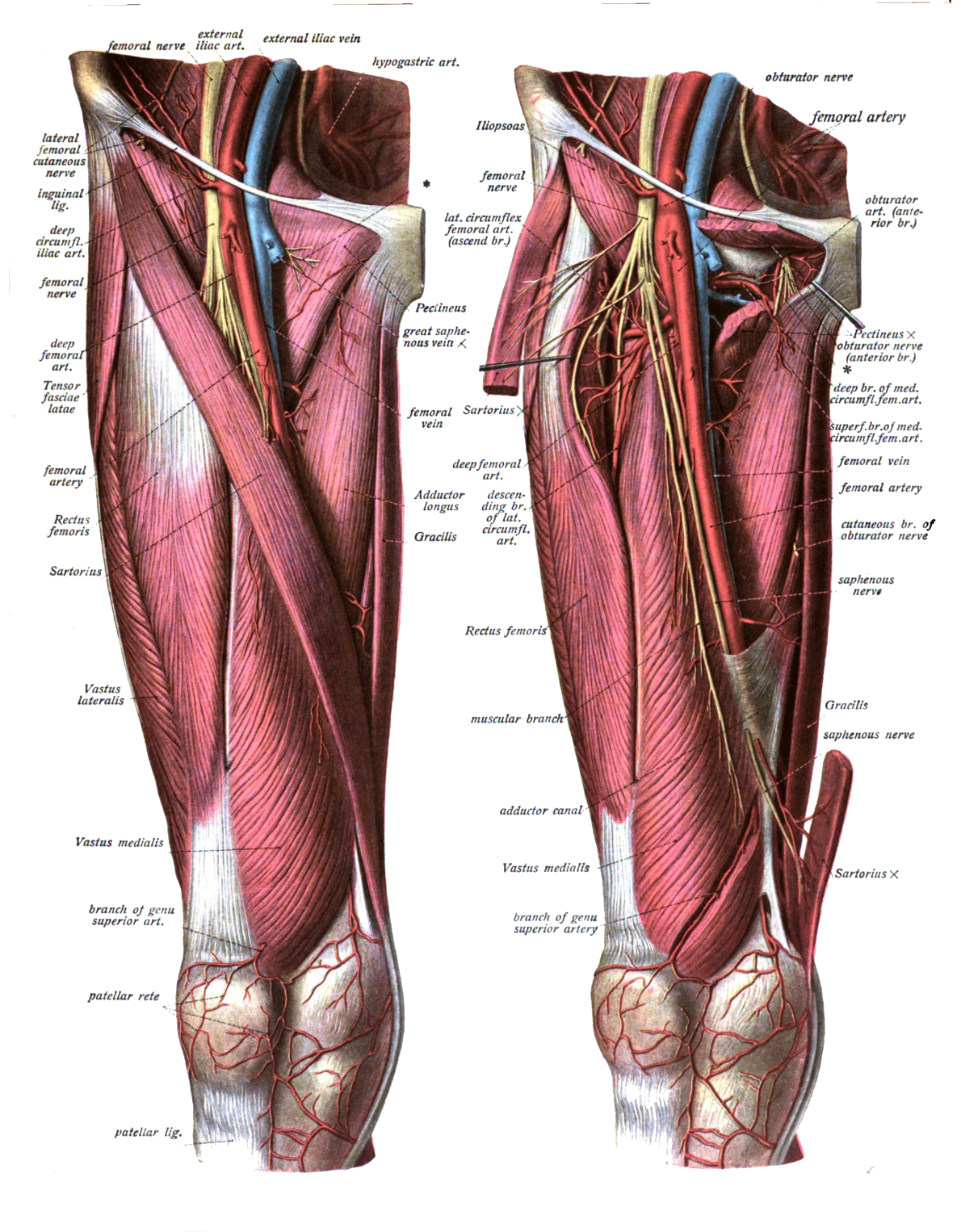
- Thigh with and without the sartorius muscle, revealing the femoral artery and vein underneath

Details
- Source: External iliac artery
- Branches: Superficial epigastric artery, superficial iliac circumflex, superficial external pudendal, deep external pudendal, deep femoral artery, continues as popliteal artery
- Vein: Femoral vein
- Supplies: Anterior compartment of thigh

Identifiers
- Latin: arteria femoralis
- MeSH: D005263
- TA98: A12.2.16.010
- TA2: 4674
- FMA: 70248

The femoral artery is a large artery in the thigh and the main arterial supply to the thigh and leg. The femoral artery gives off the deep femoral artery and descends along the anteromedial part of the thigh in the femoral triangle. It enters and passes through the adductor canal, and becomes the popliteal artery as it passes through the adductor hiatus in the adductor magnus near the junction of the middle and distal thirds of the thigh.

The femoral artery proximal to the origin of the deep femoral artery is referred to as the common femoral artery, whereas the femoral artery distal to this origin is referred to as the superficial femoral artery.

== Structure ==
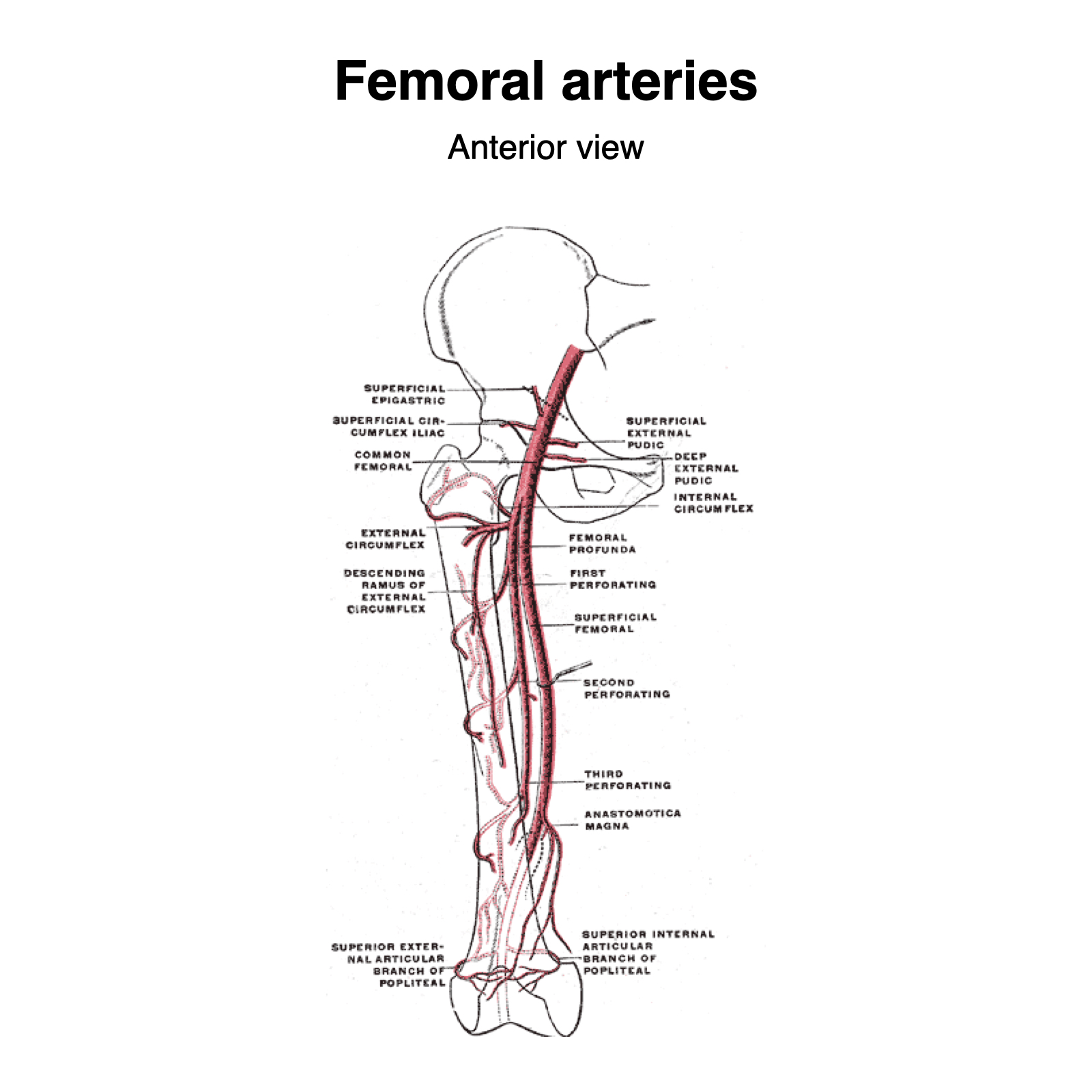
Femoral artery showing common and superficial arteries, in common usage but not listed in TA

The femoral artery represents the continuation of the external iliac artery beyond the inguinal ligament underneath which the vessel passes to enter the thigh. The vessel passes under the inguinal ligament just medial of the midpoint of this ligament, midway between the anterior superior iliac spine and the symphysis pubis (mid-inguinal point).

In common usage and in clinical practices including angiology and vascular surgery, the femoral artery includes the common femoral artery and the superficial femoral artery. However, the Terminologia Anatomica (TA) only lists the femoral artery. (The TA is the international standard for human anatomical terminology developed by the Federative International Programme on Anatomical Terminology).

- The common femoral artery (CFA) is located between the inferior margin of the inguinal ligament, and the branching point of the profunda femoris artery. Its first three or four centimetres are enclosed, with the femoral vein, in the femoral sheath. In typical anatomy, the common femoral artery lies anterior to the femoral vein in the upper thigh. The CFA is, after the popliteal artery, the most common peripheral site of general dilatation or aneurysmal formation, at a frequency of 1/10 of the aorta. Highly calcific arterial stenosis in the CFA is very difficult to treat by endovascular intervention. Stent positioning in CFA may be limited by compressive or torsional forces, leading to stent fracture and/or restenosis. On the other hand, lithoplasty balloon angioplasty may represent a safe tool to treat CFA stenosis.
- The superficial femoral artery is a designation for the segment between the branching point of the profunda femoris and the adductor hiatus, passing through the subsartorial canal. However, this term is not listed in Terminologia Anatomica, and usage of the term superficial femoral is discouraged by many physicians because it leads to confusion among general medical practitioners, at least for the femoral vein that courses next to the femoral artery. In particular, the adjacent femoral vein is clinically a deep vein, where deep vein thrombosis indicates anticoagulant or thrombolytic therapy, but the adjective "superficial" leads many physicians to falsely believe it is a superficial vein, which has resulted in patients with femoral thrombosis being denied proper treatment. Therefore, the segment is alternatively termed the subsartorial artery. The segment enters the adductor hiatus and becomes the popliteal artery which goes through the popliteal fossa.

=== Relations ===
The relations of the femoral artery are as follows:

- Anteriorly: In the upper part of its course, it is superficial and is covered by skin and fascia. In the lower part of its course, it passes behind the sartorius muscle.
- Posteriorly: The artery lies on the psoas, which separates it from the hip joint, the pectineus, and the adductor longus. The femoral vein intervenes between the artery and the adductor longus.
- Medially: It is related to the femoral vein in the upper part of its course.
- Laterally: The femoral nerve and its branches.

=== Branches ===
Schema of arteries of the thigh, including femoral artery and branches.

Common femoral artery

- The superficial circumflex iliac artery is a small branch that runs up to the region of the anterior superior iliac spine.
- The superficial epigastric artery is a small branch that crosses the inguinal ligament and runs to the region of the umbilicus.
- The superficial external pudendal artery is a small branch that runs medially to supply the skin of the scrotum or labium majus as.
- The deep external pudendal artery runs medially and supplies the skin of the scrotum or labium majus.
- The deep femoral artery is a large and important branch that arises from the lateral side of the femoral artery about 1.5 in. (4 cm) below the inguinal ligament. It passes medially behind the femoral vessels and enters the medial fascial compartment of the thigh. It ends by becoming the fourth perforating artery. At its origin, it gives off the medial and lateral circumflex femoral arteries, and during its course it gives off three perforating arteries.

Superficial femoral artery

- The descending genicular artery is a small branch that arises from the femoral artery near its termination within the adductor canal. It assists in supplying the knee joint.

== Clinical significance ==
=== Clinical examination ===
The site for optimally palpating the femoral pulse is in the inner thigh, at the mid-inguinal point, halfway between the pubic symphysis and anterior superior iliac spine. Presence of a femoral pulse indicates a systolic blood pressure of more than 50 mmHg.

=== Vascular access ===
Femoral artery is the frequent site of access in angiography. As the pulsation of the common femoral artery can often be palpated through the skin; and the site of maximum pulsation is used as a point of puncture for catheter access. From here, wires and catheters can be directed anywhere in the arterial system for intervention or diagnostics, including the heart, brain, kidneys, arms and legs. The direction of the needle in the femoral artery can be against blood flow (retro-grade), for intervention and diagnostic towards the heart and opposite leg, or with the flow (ante-grade or ipsi-lateral) for diagnostics and intervention on the same leg. Access in either the left or right femoral artery is possible and depends on the type of intervention or diagnostic.

To image the lower limb vascular anatomy, the common femoral artery (CFA) is chosen as the site of entry. However, CFA entry can only be assessed by retrograde puncture. Therefore, a catheter is advanced retrogradely through the contralateral common femoral artery into common iliac artery, crossing the midline into ipsilateral CFA. The SFA can then be assessed by antegrade puncture.

The femoral artery can be used to draw arterial blood when the blood pressure is so low that the radial or brachial arteries cannot be located.

=== Peripheral arterial disease ===
The femoral artery is susceptible to peripheral arterial disease. When it is blocked through atherosclerosis, percutaneous intervention with access from the opposite femoral may be needed. Endarterectomy, a surgical cut down and removal of the plaque of the femoral artery is also common. If the femoral artery has to be ligated surgically to treat a popliteal aneurysm, blood can still reach the popliteal artery distal to the ligation via the genicular anastomosis. However, if flow in the femoral artery of a normal leg is suddenly disrupted, blood flow distally is rarely sufficient. The reason for this is the fact that the genicular anastomosis is only present in a minority of individuals and is always undeveloped when disease in the femoral artery is absent.

== See also ==
- Brachial artery, an arm based artery with a similar function

== Additional images ==
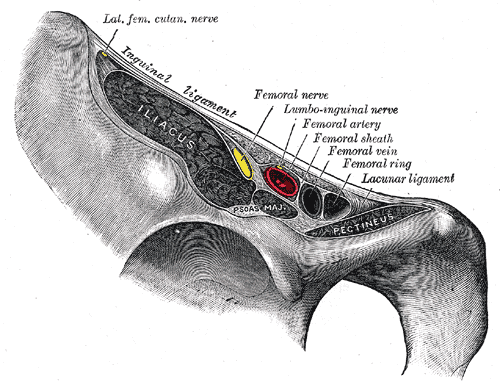
Structures passing behind the inguinal ligament. (Femoral artery labeled at upper right.)

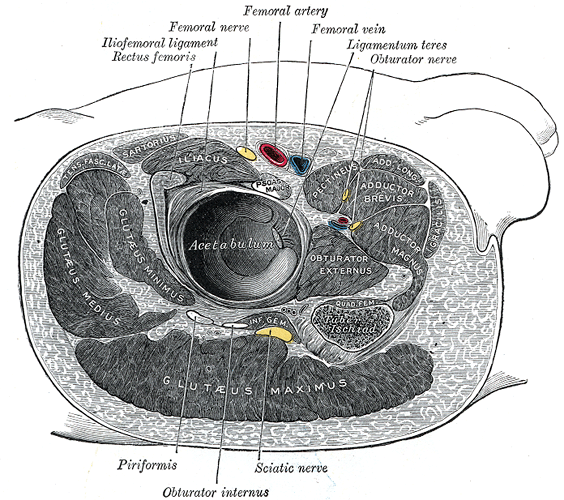
Cross-section showing structures surrounding right hip-joint.

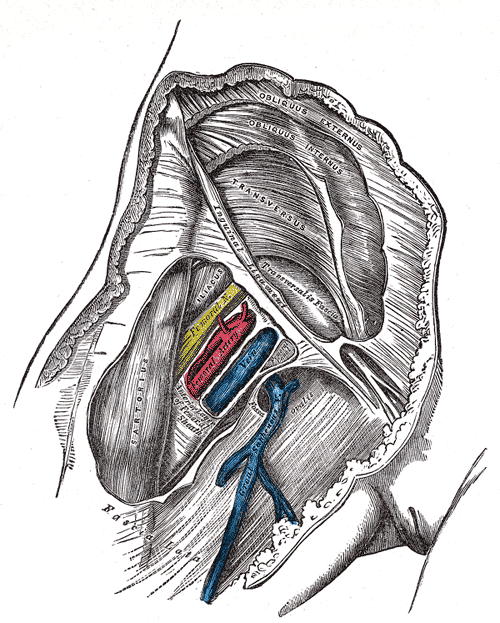
Femoral sheath laid open to show its three compartments.

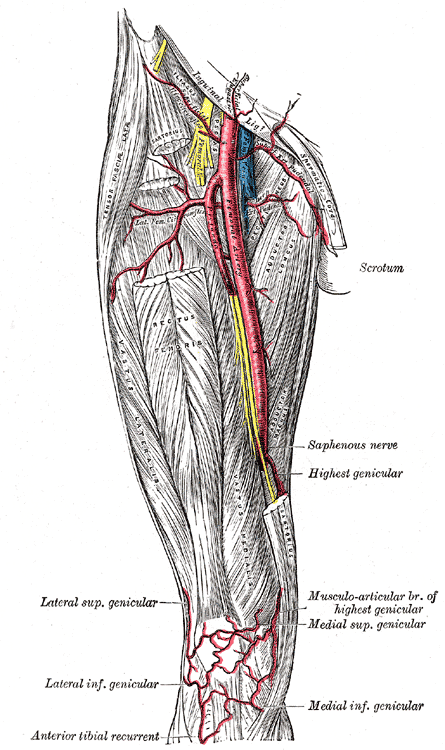
The femoral artery.

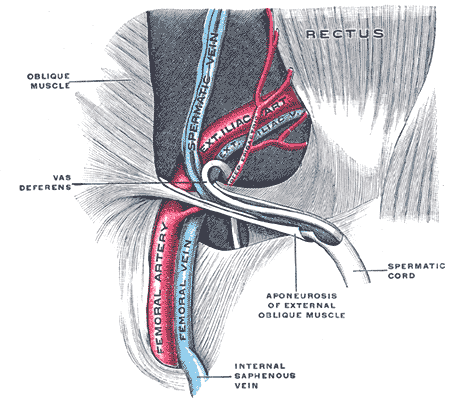
The spermatic cord in the inguinal canal.

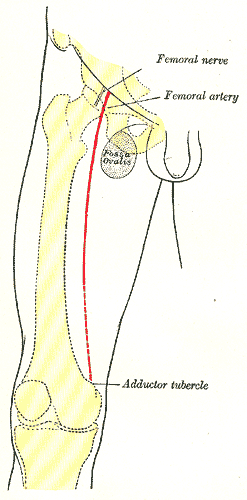
Front of right thigh, showing surface markings for bones, femoral artery and femoral nerve.

Femoral artery and its major branches - right thigh, anterior view.

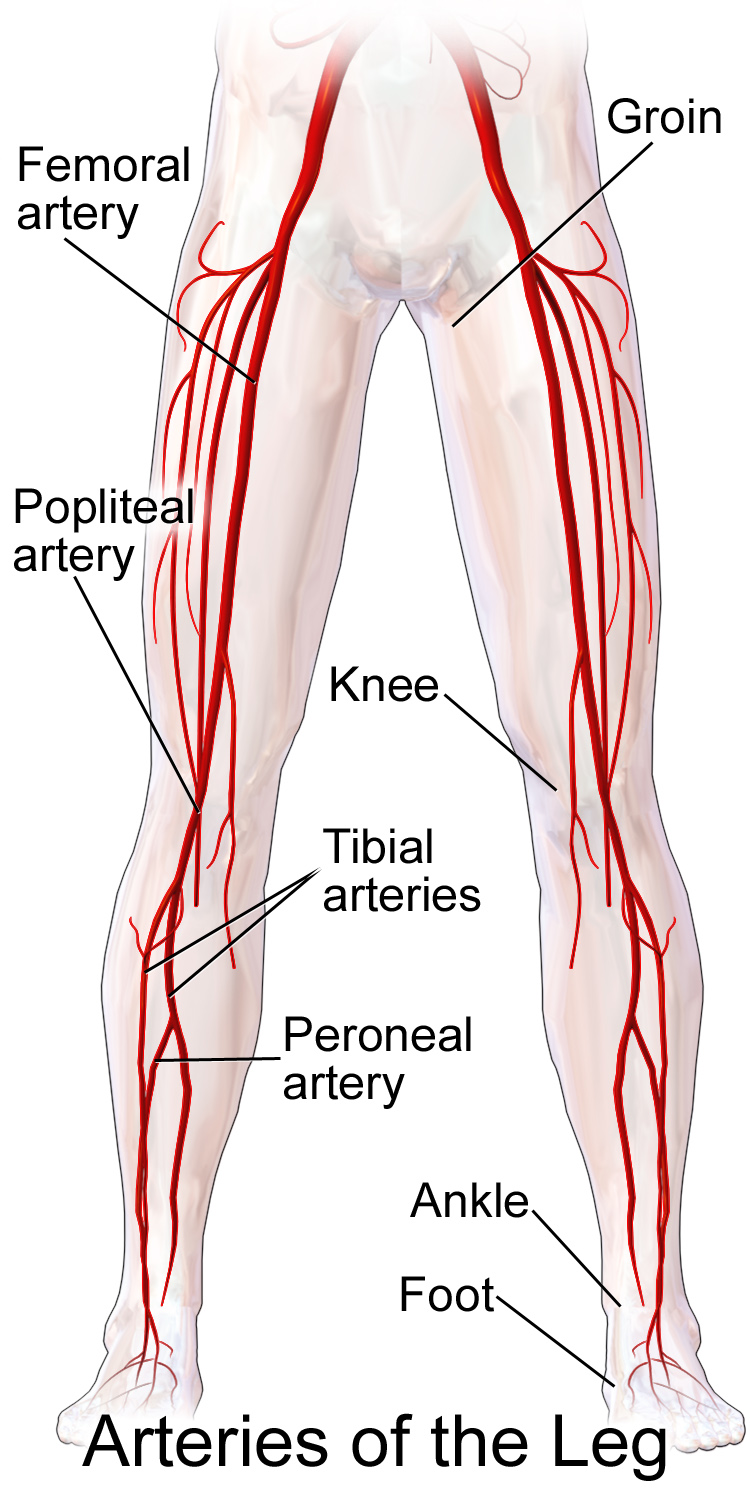
Illustration depicting main leg arteries (anterior view).

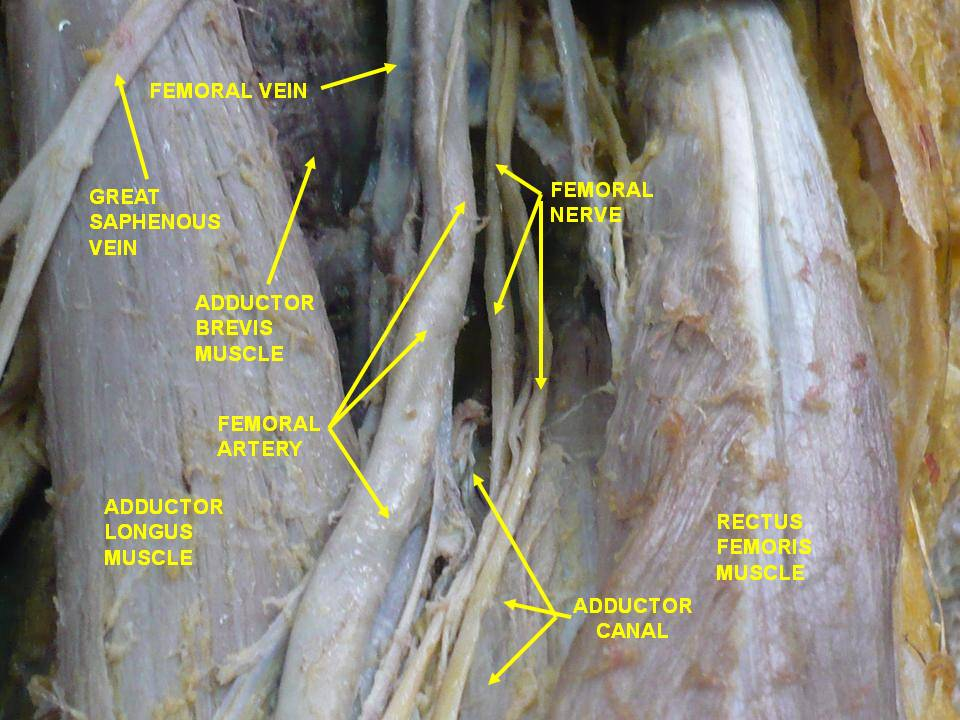
Femoral artery - deep dissection.

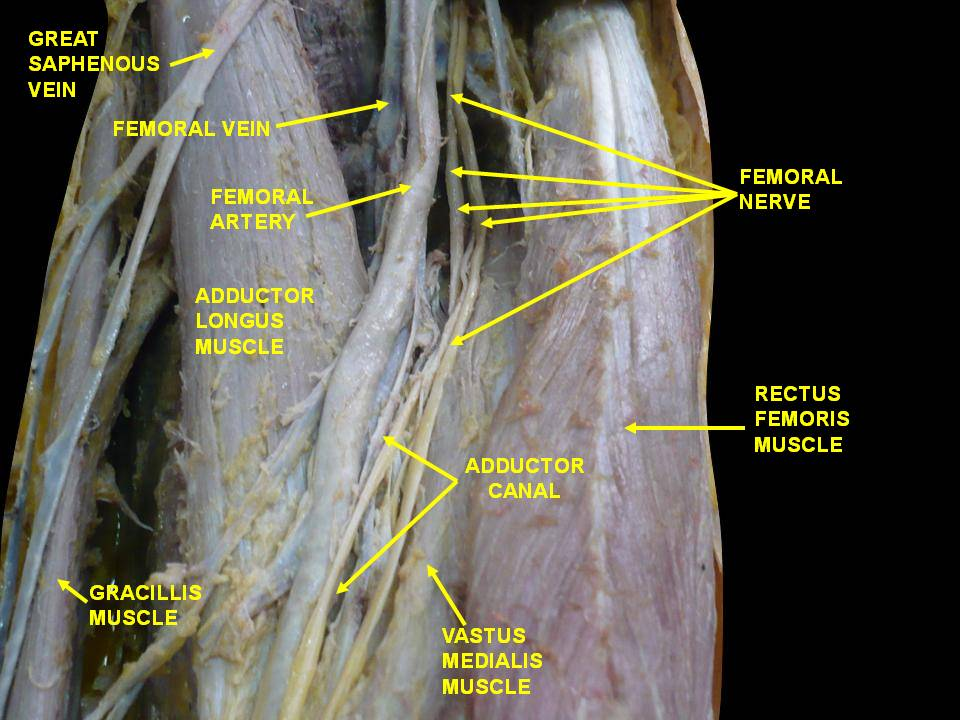
Femoral artery - deep dissection.
