= Urogenital hiatus =

Part of the pelvic floor

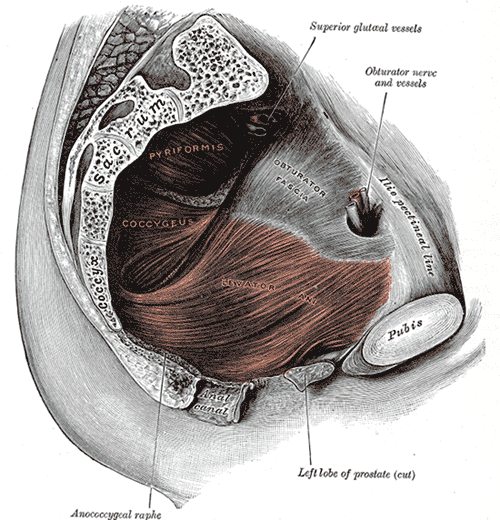

Details

Identifiers
- Latin: hiatus urogenitalis
- TA98: A04.5.04.010
- TA2: 2410
- FMA: 77256

The urogenital hiatus is a large midline opening in the anteromedial part of the pelvic floor (more precisely, the pubococcygeal muscle), extending between the pubis (anteriorly), and rectum (posteriorly). Each levator ani muscle forms either lateral border of the hiatus.

The hiatus acccomodates the apex of the prostate in males, and gives passage to the urethra in both sexes, the vagina in females, the deep dorsal vein of clitoris (females) or penis (males), and nerves of the penis in males.

== Clinical significance ==
The urogenital hiatus has been linked to urinary stress incontinence.

== See also ==
- Coccyx (tailbone)
- Pubococcygeus muscle
- Pelvic floor dysfunction
- Perineology
- Perineal hernia
- Female genital prolapse
