= Abdominal fascia =

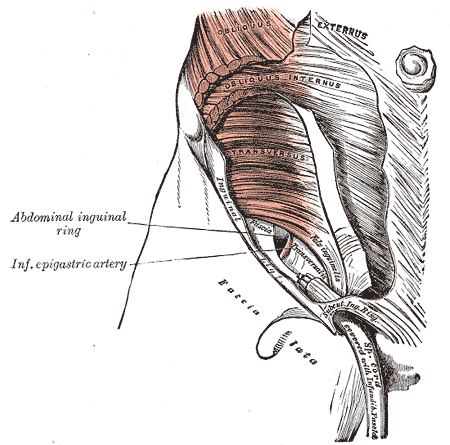
- The abdominal inguinal ring.

Details

Identifiers
- Latin: fascia abdominis
- TA98: A04.5.02.001
- TA2: 2383
- FMA: 19841

Abdominal fascia refers to the various types of fascia found in the abdominal region. Fascia is a sheet of connective tissue that is found beneath the skin that attaches, stabilizes, encloses, and separates muscles and other internal organs. Everyone has fascia, as it is part of how the human body is composed. Fascia is organized by layer, and can also be classified by location or function in the body. While abdominal fascia is quite a simple part of how the human body is made up, there are other implications and involvements that abdominal fascia is a part of.

== Research ==
In a 2016 study, abdominal superficial fascia was collected from both male and female cadavers. The elastic, collagen, and hydroxyproline components were sampled and then studied. It was found that the elastic, collagen, and hydroxyproline components were higher in upper abdomen regions compared to lower abdomen regions. This could be a reason as to why bulging of the abdomen and skin sagging occurs more in the lower regions of people, compared to the upper regions. This study that was conducted could lead to further discussions and studies in finding ways to manage obesity.

In a study from January 2011, Mechanical properties of abdominal human fascia were studied according to the direction of loading and localization. Human umbilical (UF) and transversalis fascia (FT) have been studied to understand the differences in mechanical properties of the human body. The differences between the mechanical properties of both UF and FT were not significant according to localization; therefore, the mechanical properties of human abdominal fascia are not controlled by the localization.

Another study from 2018, showed differences in mechanical and structural properties of human fascia and their gender differences. While the study was done on fascia from the thighs, the results which were comparing the differences between males and females, can also be applied to understanding the abdominal area of males and females. Ultimately, it was found that the fascia lata at the lateral site was thicker and longitudinally directed fibers had higher rates of distribution compared to other sites.

== Further Findings ==
It can be involved in certain forms of breast reconstruction.
