= Popliteal artery entrapment syndrome =

Abnormal popliteal artery compression by surrounding structures

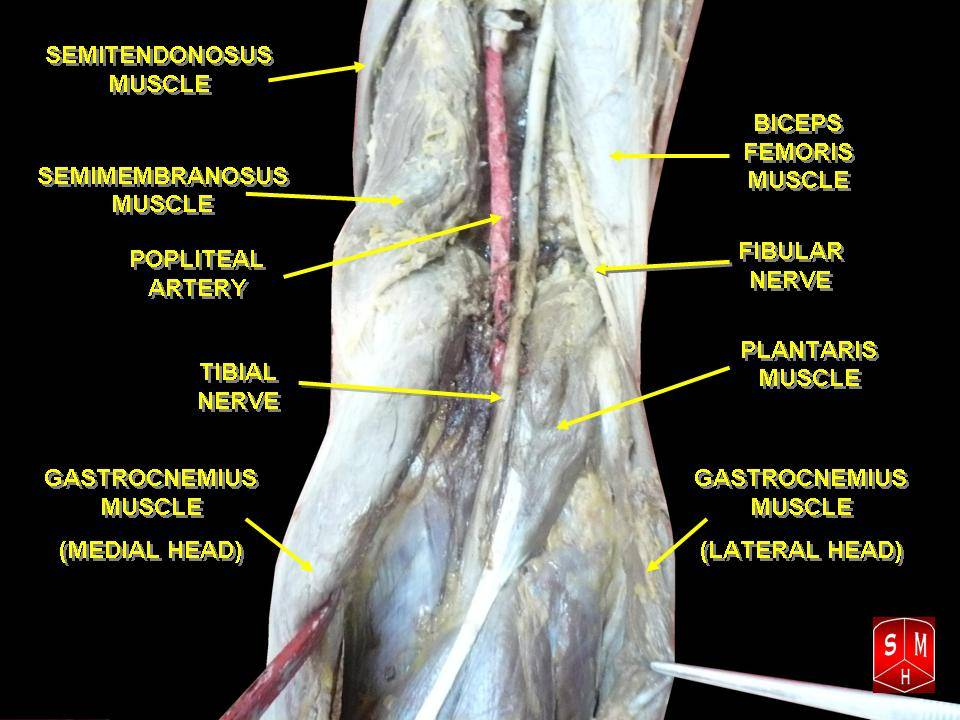
- Normal course of the popliteal artery at the back of the knee
- Symptoms: Numbness, discoloration, absent pulses, coolness
- Complications: Distal artery stenosis, limb amputation, arterial thromboembolism
- Duration: Chronic
- Causes: Congenital or functional
- Risk factors: Young athlete males.
- Treatment: Open surgical decompression
- Prognosis: Favorable

The popliteal artery entrapment syndrome (PAES) is an uncommon pathology that occurs when the popliteal artery is compressed by the surrounding popliteal fossa myofascial structures. This results in claudication and chronic leg ischemia. This condition mainly occurs more in young athletes than in the elderly. Elderly people, who present with similar symptoms, are more likely to be diagnosed with peripheral artery disease with associated atherosclerosis. Patients with PAES mainly present with intermittent feet and calf pain associated with exercises and relieved with rest. PAES can be diagnosed with a combination of medical history, physical examination, and advanced imaging modalities such as duplex ultrasound, computer tomography, or magnetic resonance angiography. Management can range from non-intervention to open surgical decompression with a generally good prognosis. Complications of untreated PAES can include stenotic artery degeneration, complete popliteal artery occlusion, distal arterial thromboembolism, or even formation of an aneurysm.

== History ==
In 1879, the syndrome was first described in a 64 years old male by Anderson Stuart, a medical student. In 1959, Hamming and Vink first described the management of the PAES in a 12-year-old patient. The patient was treated with myotomy of the medial head of the gastrocnemius muscle and concomitant endarterectomy of the popliteal artery. They later reported four more cases and claimed that the incidence of this pathology in patients younger than 30 years old with claudication was 40%. Servello was the first to draw attention to diminished distal pulses observed with forced plantar- or dorsiflexion in patients with this syndrome. In 1981, Bouhoutsos and Daskalakis reported 45 cases of this syndrome in a population of 20,000 Greek soldiers. Over the last few decades, the increasing frequency with which popliteal artery entrapment is reported, strongly suggests greater awareness of the syndrome.

== Epidemiology ==
In the general population, popliteal artery entrapment syndrome (PAES) has an estimated prevalence of 0.16%. It is most commonly found in young, physically active males. In fact, sixty percent of all cases of this syndrome occur in athletically active males under the age of 30. The predilection of this syndrome presents in a male to female ratio of 15:1. This discrepancy in prevalence may be overestimated due the findings that males are generally found to be more physically active than females or because a large portion of the data is from military hospitals that treat mostly male populations. Functional PAES, the more common variant, tends to skew towards young, physically active females. People, who participate in running, soccer, football, basketball, or rugby, are at increased risk.

Newborns and young children are also at increased PAES risk due to congenital causes. During embryonic development, the medial head of gastrocnemius migrates medially and superiorly. This migration can cause structural abnormalities, such as irregular positioning of the popliteal artery, and can account for the rare instances of entrapment caused by the popliteus muscle. Less than 3% of all people are born with this anatomical defect that progresses into PAES, and of those who are born with the anatomical defect, the majority never develop symptoms. Bilateral presentation of PAES is found in approximately 30% of cases.

== Pathophysiology and classification ==
PAES can be classified as either congenital or functional. Analysis of human embryological development has shown that the popliteal artery and the medial head of the gastrocnemius muscle arise at approximately the same time. Because of that, abnormal development of muscle's position in relation to the nearby vessels can result in potential vascular compromise. The varying types of PAES can be classified based on aberrant migration and resultant attachments of the medial head of the gastrocnemius muscle. Type VI PAES (functional PAES) describes a subtype that is due to repeated microtrauma resulting in the destruction of the internal elastic lamina and damage to the smooth muscles resulting in fibrosis and scar formation.

Types of Popliteal Artery Entrapment Syndrome
Type I	The popliteal artery courses more medially around a normally positioned medial head of the gastrocnemius muscle.
Type II	The medial head of the gastrocnemius muscle attaches more laterally to the femur.
Type III	Aberrant additional tendon of the gastrocnemius muscle encircles a normally positioned popliteal artery.
Type IV	The popliteal artery is compressed by the popliteus muscle or a fibrous brand.
Type V	The compression of both the popliteal artery and vein by any of the above causes.
Type VI	The normally positioned popliteal artery is entrapped by the gastrocnemius muscle hypertrophy.

Additionally, a more practical classification system was introduced by Heidelberg et al. This system classifies PAES into three main types:

- Type 1: The problem lies in the abnormal position of the popliteal artery.
- Type 2: The problem lies in the abnormal insertion of the medial head of the gastrocnemius muscle.
- Type 3: Both types 1 and 2 are present.

== Medical history and physical examination ==
Patients with PAES are typically healthy young males without previous history of cardiovascular risk factors such as smoking, hypertension, hypercholesterolemia, or diabetes. Typically, patients present with posterior intermittent claudication that is worsened with exercise and relieved with rest. Specifically, walking up stairs or inclines tends to be the strongest and most common trigger of PAES symptoms due to leg/knee positioning, flexion of the foot, and the groups of muscles being used. Associated symptoms include numbness, discoloration, pallor, and coolness in the affected lower extremity. Physical examination of suspected PAES may show hypertrophy of the calf muscles, as well as diminished, unequal, or absent pulses in the lower extremity upon plantar- or dorsiflexion.

== Diagnosis ==
=== Differential diagnosis ===
- Chronic exertional compartment syndrome: Chronic pain and swelling of the affected muscle secondary to increase intramuscular pressure during exercise.
- Unresolved muscle strain: An injury or damage to the muscle or its attaching tendons.
- Medial tibial stress syndrome: Pain occurs over the shin bone (the tibia) with running or other sport-related activity.
- Fibular and tibial stress fracture: Non-displaced microscopic fracture of the fibular and tibia occurs in many athletes, especially runners, and also in non-athletes who suddenly increase their activity level.
- Fascial defects: The protrusion of the muscle through the surrounding fascia leads to pain and swelling of the area.
- Sciatic nerve entrapment syndrome: The sciatic nerve becomes entrapped by muscles or other structures.
- Vascular claudication (secondary to atherosclerosis): The obstruction of arterial flow leads to muscular ischemia and causes pain in the buttock and calf. More common in the elderly with cardiovascular risk factors.
- Lumbar disc herniation: A bulging disc or a herniated disc in the lower back which causes radiating pain from the buttock into the leg and sometimes into the foot.

=== Diagnostic challenges ===
PAES is a particularly difficult condition to diagnose, and is easily and frequently missed. Claudication in young people presents a list of possible diagnoses, many of which are difficult to distinguish and test. Many testing modalities, such as MRA, magnetic resonance imaging, require the patient to hold still while flexing the muscles in a way that causes symptoms, making it incredibly difficult to get a clear scan due to the amount of pain the patient experiences. Type VI PAES, also known as functional PAES, often is missed as scans of the area lack anatomical abnormalities. Notably, PAES patients are often misdiagnosed with chronic exertional compartment syndrome. PAES pain is most commonly present in the superficial posterior compartment, whereas CECS is almost always isolated in the anterior or deep posterior compartments. However, CECS and PAES cannot be conclusively distinguished between based on symptoms alone.

=== Evaluation ===
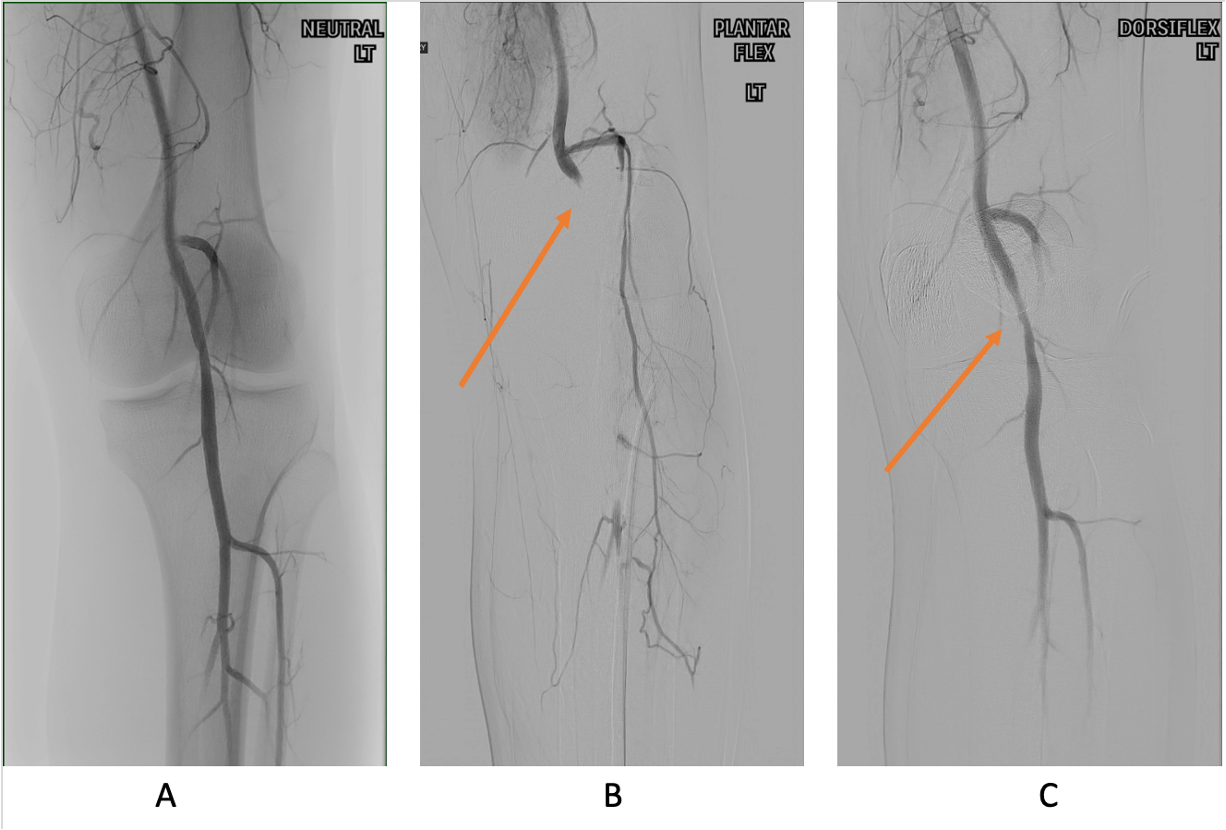
Angiograms of a patient diagnosed with popliteal artery entrapment syndrome of the left lower extremity. Image A shows a neutral popliteal artery before provocative maneuvers. Images B and C show the obstruction (orange arrows) enhanced with provocative maneuvers of plantar flexion and dorsiflexion, respectively.

PAES should be suspected in young healthy patients with clinical symptoms consistent with compression of the vascular structures and without significant cardiovascular risk factors such as smoking. Additionally, if attempts at physical therapy have failed, PAES should be considered. Multiple imaging modalities are used to confirm the diagnosis of PAES. Based on a systemic review by Sinha et al, digital subtraction angiography (DSA) is the most common imaging used for PAES diagnosis, followed by ankle–brachial index (18 percent), computed tomography angiography (CTA) (12 percent), magnetic resonance angiography (MRA) (12 percent), duplex ultrasonography (DU) (10 percent), exercise ankle-brachial index (4 percent), and other modalities (4 percent). According to a recent study by Willimas et al, a combination of DU and MRA is far superior in diagnosing PAES.

Provocative maneuvers can be used to improve visualization of PAES on the images. The patient is initially positioned supine with the legs straight, and then instructed to forcefully plantar-flex. A plantarflexion force of 0 to 70 percent maximum has been shown to maximize the sensitivity and specificity for PAES diagnosis. The DU can be a quick, inexpensive, and noninvasive initial screening for PAES. Flow velocities in the popliteal artery will increase, as the popliteal artery is compressed, which is reflected on the DU. If DU is negative but there is still strong suspicion for PAES, MRA or CTA with provocative maneuvers are needed as follow-up imaging. MRA would demonstrate a focal occlusion or narrowing of the mid-popliteal artery, post-stenotic dilatation, or aneurysm of the distal popliteal artery. If MRA or CTA is non-conclusive, DSA may be used as a further option with a high sensitivity (> 97%) for PAES diagnosis.

Additionally, functional PAES in which the gastrocnemius hypertrophy causes arterial compression during exercise can be best evaluated with dynamic CT. For dynamic CT, initial images are taken with the patient still. Further images are taken following a series of provocative maneuvers.

== Management ==
- Asymptomatic patients: the management is typically expectant. PAES may be found incidentally on the imaging, but the patient may be symptom-free, thus, no intervention is required.
- Symptomatic patients: open surgical decompression is the mainstay of treatment for PAES. The release of entrapment is achieved by performing division of the medial head of the gastrocnemius or musculotendinous band. The surgery can be performed with either posterior or medial approaches. Previous studies show a medial approach is beneficial for type I and II while a posterior approach is better for type III and IV. Additionally, the use of Botulinum Toxin A has been used as an alternative noninvasive treatment for functional PAES. A diagnosis of functional PAES is made if symptoms are improved after Botulinum injection. However, If symptoms are persisted, the patient can undergo an additional Botulinum injection or proceed with surgical decompression.

The outcome following the surgery is usually favorable. Successful resolution of PAES occurs in 77 percent of cases. Surgical complications include deep vein thrombosis, hematoma, wound infection, or seroma. After the surgery, patient is usually monitored using arterial duplex ultrasonography 1, 3, 6, and 12 months, and annually after that.

== Complications of untreated PAES ==
Early detection and management of PAES can lead to a favorable outcome. However, prolonged compression of popliteal artery can lead to extensive arterial damage and permanent claudication or limb loss. Complications of PAES may include:

- Distal arterial thromboembolism.
- Popliteal artery thrombosis.
- Popliteal artery stenosis.
- Limbs amputation.

Nonetheless, the course of PAES is often slow and takes time, thus, limbs loss is rarely seen, even in PAES patients.
