= Deep circumflex iliac artery =

Artery in the pelvis

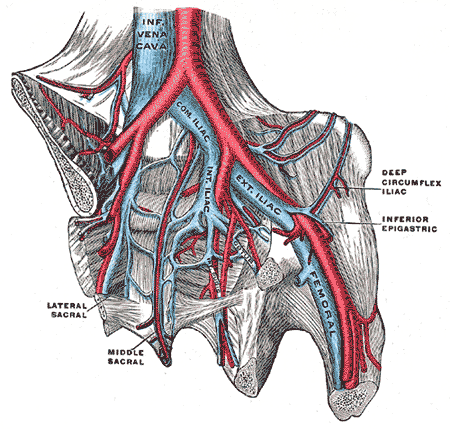
- The iliac veins.

Details
- Source: External iliac artery
- Vein: Deep circumflex iliac vein

Identifiers
- Latin: arteria circumflexa ilium profunda
- TA98: A12.2.16.008
- TA2: 4364
- FMA: 20687

The deep circumflex iliac artery (or deep iliac circumflex artery) is an artery in the pelvis that travels along the iliac crest of the pelvic bone.

== Course ==
The deep circumflex iliac artery arises from the lateral aspect of the external iliac artery nearly opposite the origin of the inferior epigastric artery.

It ascends obliquely and laterally, posterior to the inguinal ligament, contained in a fibrous sheath formed by the junction of the transversalis fascia and iliac fascia. It travels to the anterior superior iliac spine, where it anastomoses with the ascending branch of the lateral femoral circumflex artery.

It then pierces the transversalis fascia and passes medially along the inner lip of the crest of the ilium to a point where it perforates the transversus abdominis muscle. From there, it travels posteriorly between the transversus abdominis muscle and the internal oblique muscle to anastomose with the iliolumbar artery and the superior gluteal artery.

Opposite the anterior superior iliac spine of the ilium, it gives off a large ascending branch. This branch ascends between the internal oblique muscle and the transversus abdominis muscle, supplying them, and anastomosing with the lumbar arteries and inferior epigastric artery.

The deep circumflex artery serves as the primary blood supply to the anterior iliac crest bone flap.

== Additional images ==
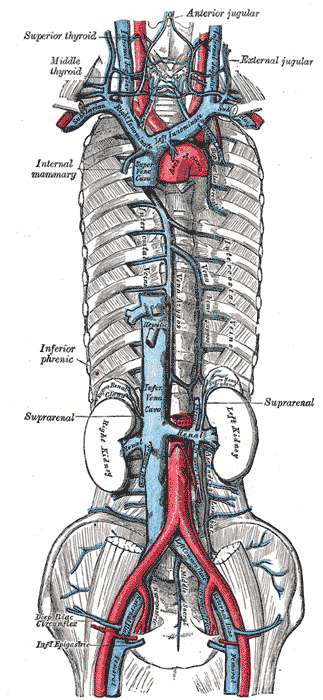
The venæ cavæ and azygos veins, with their tributaries.

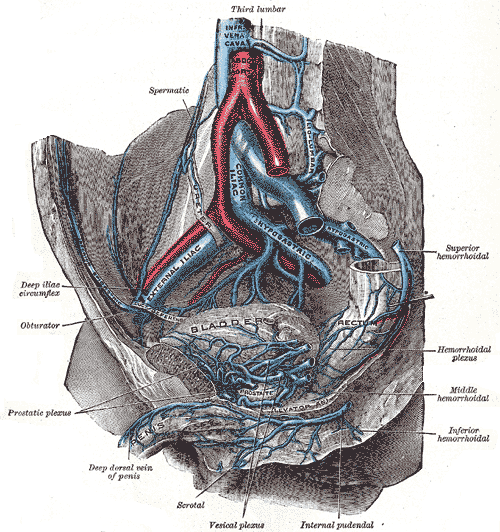
The veins of the right half of the male pelvis.

Schema of the arteries arising from the external iliac and femoral arteries.
