= Femoral vein =

Large blood vessel in the leg

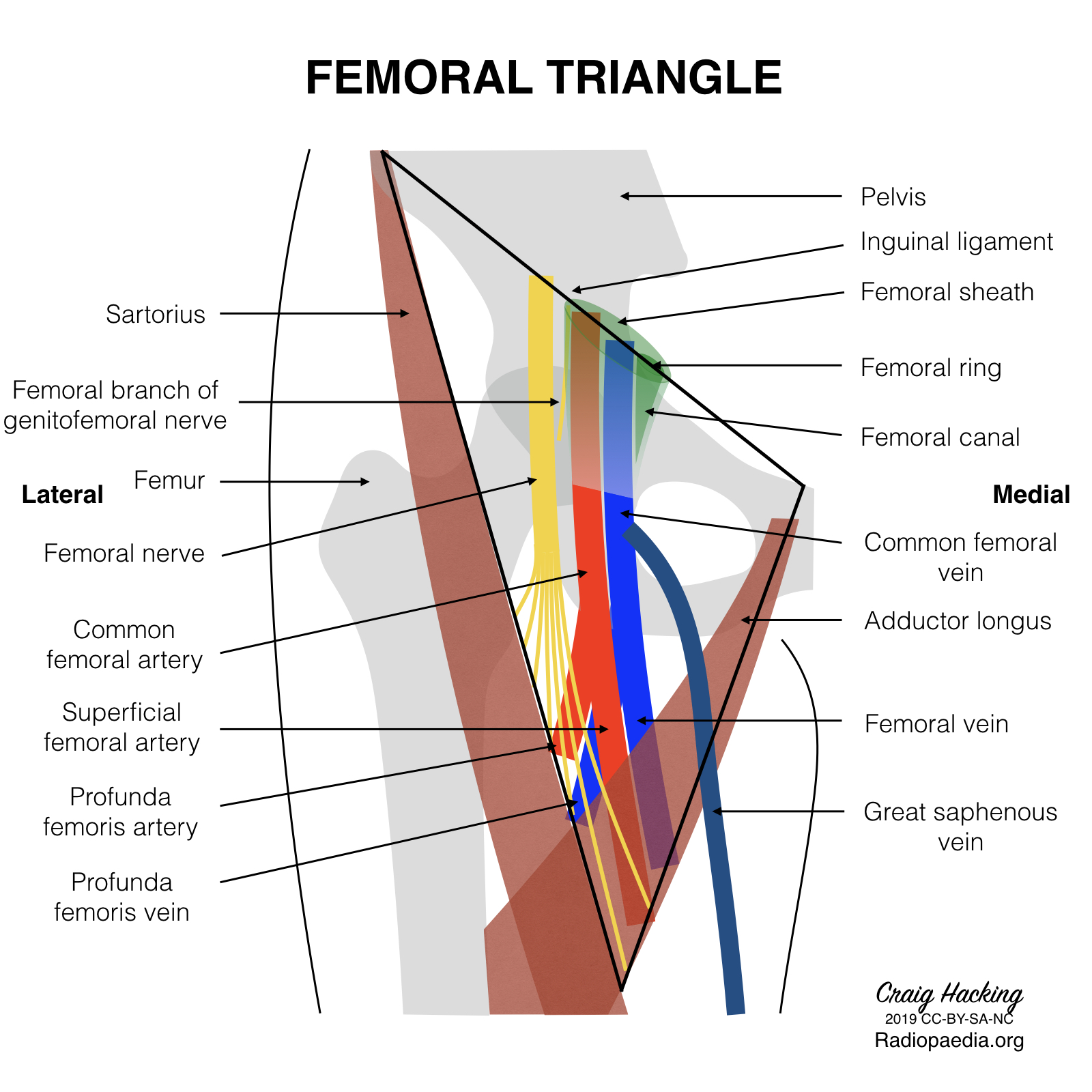
- Femoral vein shown in the femoral triangle

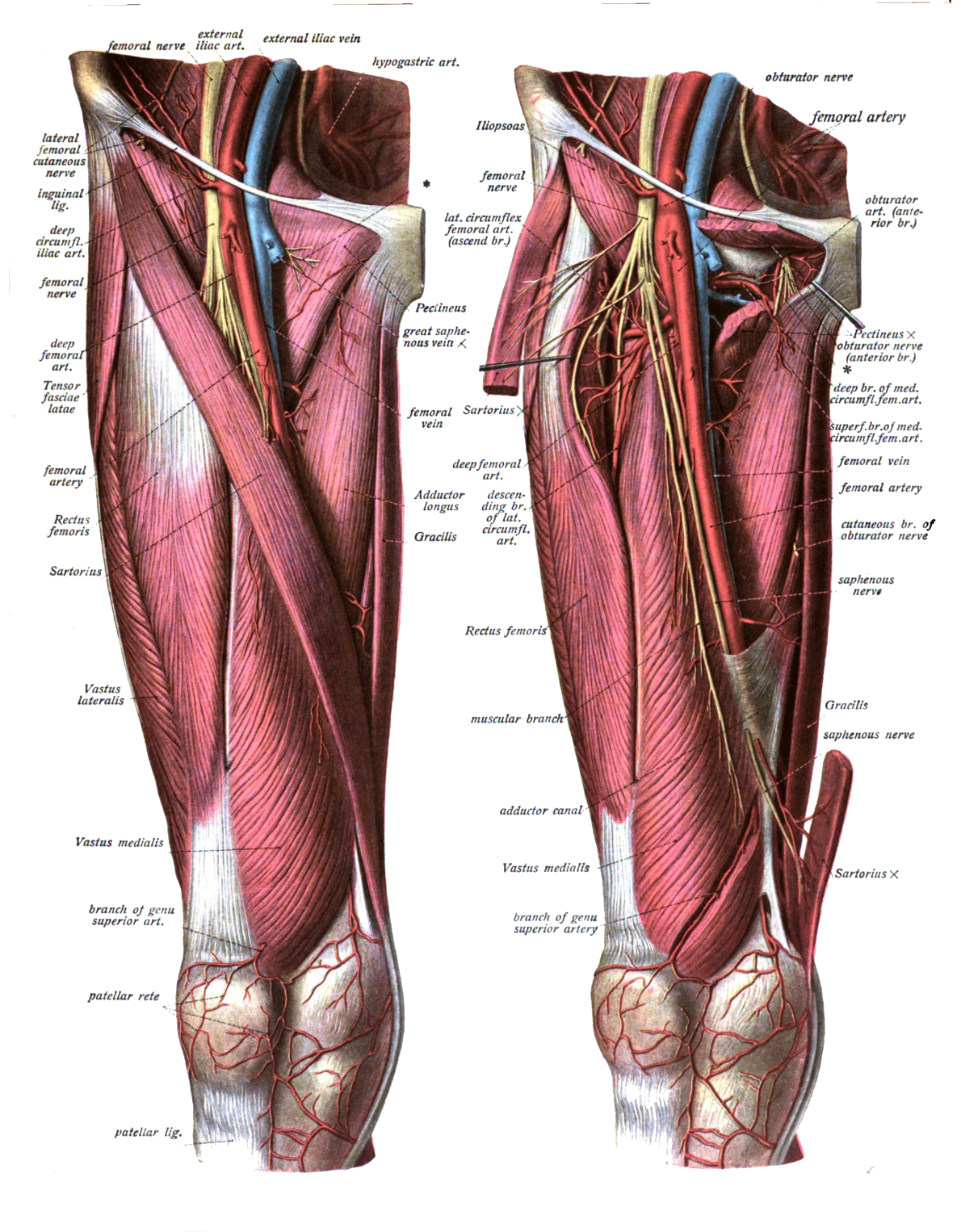
- Images with and without the sartorius muscle, showing the femoral vein and artery beneath

Details
- Source: Popliteal, profunda femoris, great saphenous
- Drains to: External iliac vein
- Artery: Femoral artery

Identifiers
- Latin: vena femoralis
- MeSH: D005268
- TA98: A12.3.11.023
- TA2: 5055
- FMA: 21185

In the human body, the femoral vein is the vein that accompanies the femoral artery in the femoral sheath. It is a deep vein that begins at the adductor hiatus (an opening in the adductor magnus muscle) as the continuation of the popliteal vein. The great saphenous vein (a superficial vein), and the deep femoral vein drain into the femoral vein in the femoral triangle when it becomes known as the common femoral vein. It ends at the inferior margin of the inguinal ligament where it becomes the external iliac vein. Its major tributaries are the deep femoral vein, and the great saphenous vein. The femoral vein contains valves.

== Structure ==
The femoral vein bears valves which are mostly bicuspid and whose number is variable between individuals and often between left and right leg.

=== Course ===
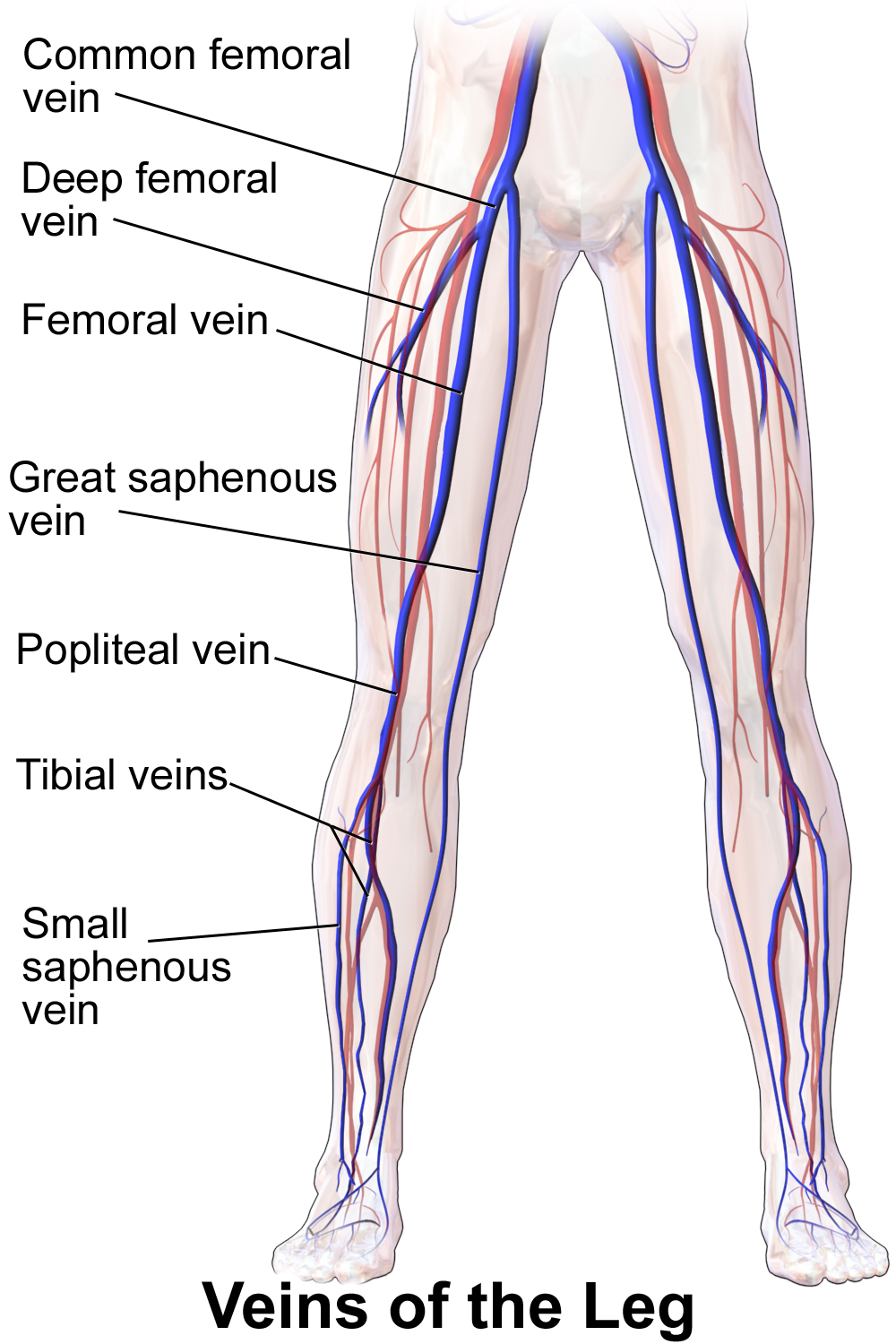
Veins of the leg. Common femoral vein shown, in common usage but not listed in TA.

The femoral vein continues into the thigh as the continuation from the popliteal vein at the back of the knee. It drains blood from the deep thigh muscles and thigh bone. Proximal to the confluence with the deep femoral vein, and the joining of the great saphenous vein, the femoral vein is widely known as the common femoral vein. As the common femoral vein leaves the inguinal ligament region it becomes the external iliac vein. Other tributaries of the femoral vein are lateral and medial circumflex femoral veins.

The common femoral vein is the segment of the femoral vein between the branching point of the deep femoral vein and the inferior margin of the inguinal ligament. It is not listed in Terminologia Anatomica, which is the international standard for human anatomical terminology developed by the Federative International Programme on Anatomical Terminology. However, it was thought to be due for inclusion in the next edition following consensus documents presented in 2001 at the 14th World Congress of the International Union of Phlebology, and in 2004 at the 21st World Congress of the International Union of Angiology. These consensus documents were brought about by the need felt for more clarity and expansion of terms.

==== Distal segment ====
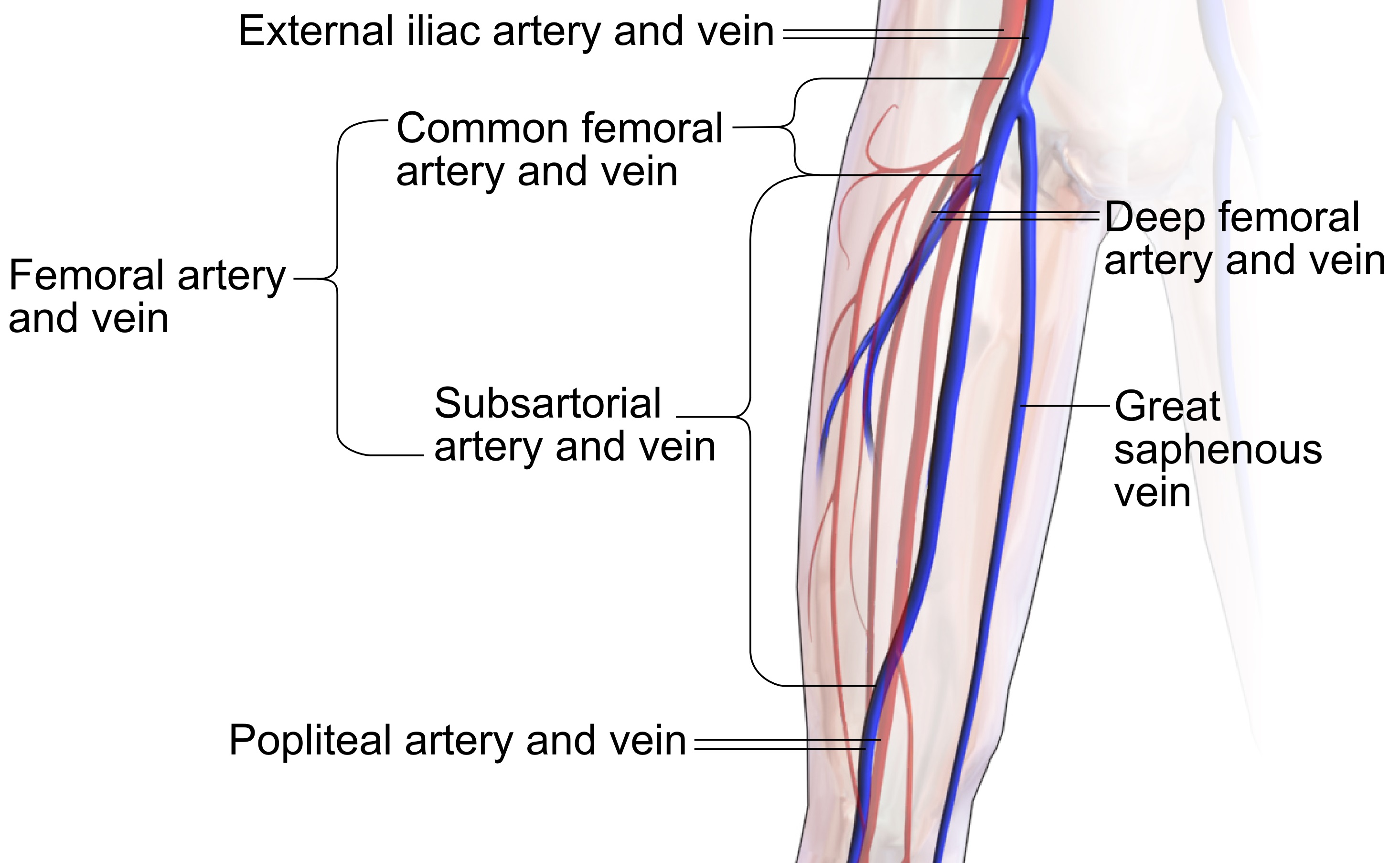
Segments of the femoral vein.

In the past, the femoral vein was seen to follow the superficial femoral artery a name used to distinguish the femoral artery from the deep femoral artery; as per the norm of naming veins to match their artery the femoral vein was called the superficial femoral vein. This was a potentially harmful misnomer since the femoral vein is a deep vein and not a superficial vein, and thus a possible site for a deep vein thrombosis, that may be overlooked as a superficial vein for anticoagulant therapy.

Because of the widespread misunderstanding, and possible harmful results from the use of superficial femoral vein, a consensus was arrived at in 2001 during the World Congress of the International Union of Phlebology to change the name from superficial femoral vein simply to femoral vein. This has been widely recognised and adopted though the use of superficial femoral vein still persists in some sources. Its use is actively discouraged. It has been suggested that another term be used – the subsartorial vein. A previous usage of subsartorial artery was published to avoid the name superficial femoral vein from being used. As per the consensus of 2002, the superficial femoral artery was unchanged.

=== Tributaries ===
The great saphenous vein, and the deep femoral vein are two large tributaries that drain into the femoral vein which then becomes known as the common femoral vein. Other smaller vein tributaries are the lateral and medial circumflex femoral veins. These circumflex veins follow the lateral circumflex femoral artery, and the medial circumflex femoral artery.

== Clinical significance ==
The femoral vein is a common site for a deep vein thrombosis. This can be a proximal DVT in the femoral vein, or more proximal as an iliofemoral DVT usually associated with the common femoral vein. An iliofemoral DVT carries a greater risk of a pulmonary embolism developing.

The femoral vein is often used to place a central venous catheter, or line for venous access. Ultrasound imaging for locating the vein and catheter placement is advocated over the use of anatomical landmarks due to the possible presence of anatomical variants. This is associated with a significant risk of infection.

The practice of delivering recreational drugs intravenously using the femoral vein in the groin is relatively common amongst injecting drug users.

== Additional images ==
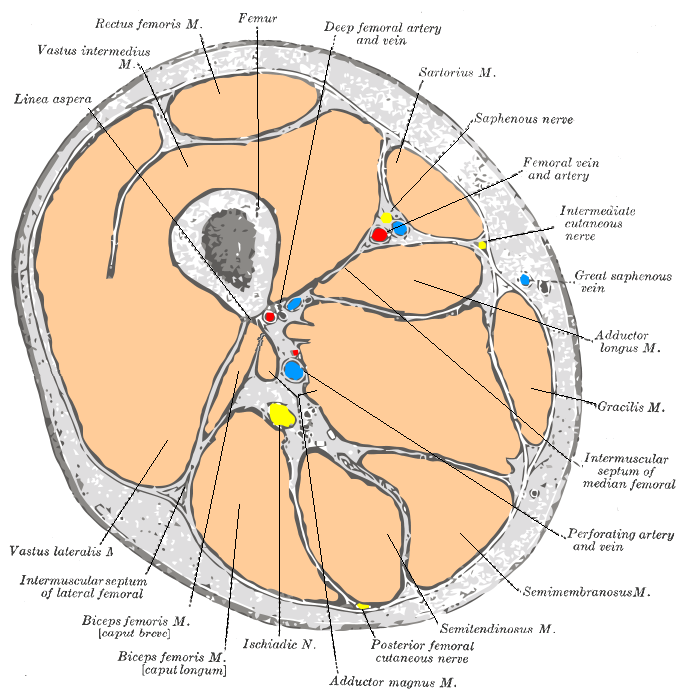
Position of femoral vein and artery in adductor canal

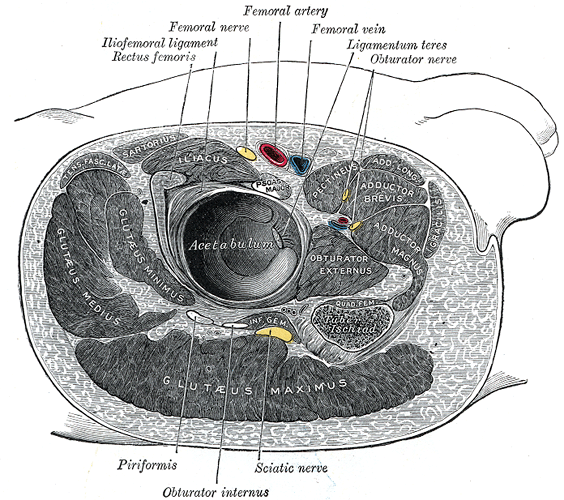
Structures surrounding right hip-joint.

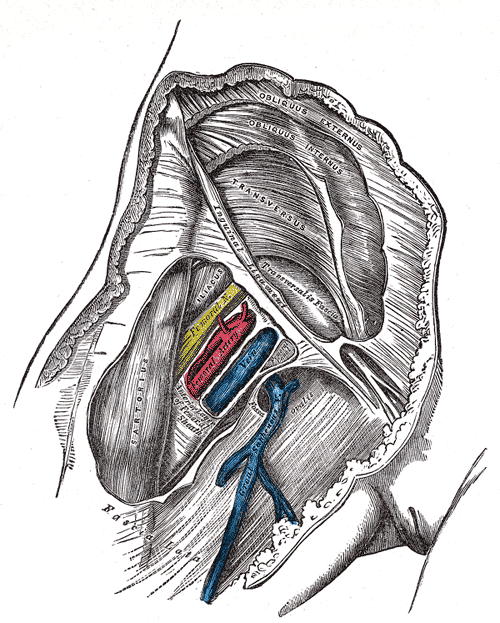
Femoral sheath laid open to show its three compartments.

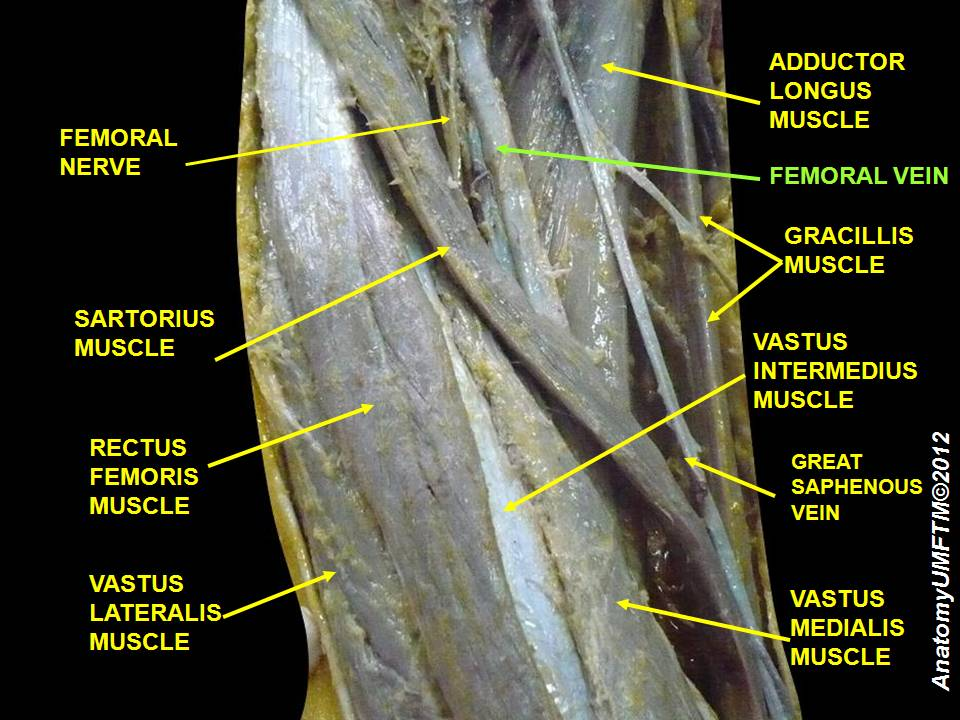
Femoral vein
