= Inguinal ligament =

Band running from the pubic tubercle to the anterior superior iliac spine

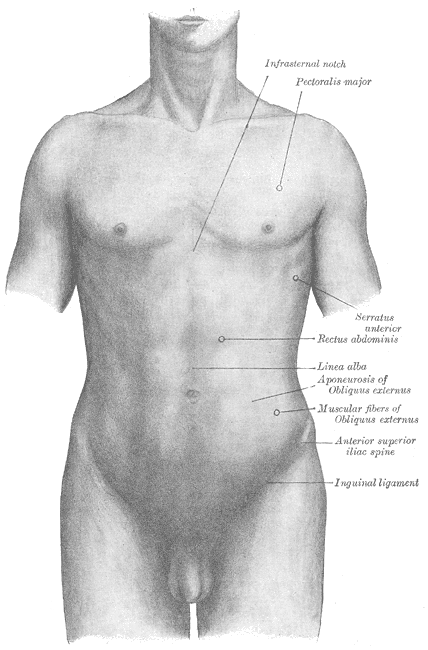
- Inguinal ligament is labeled at bottom right.

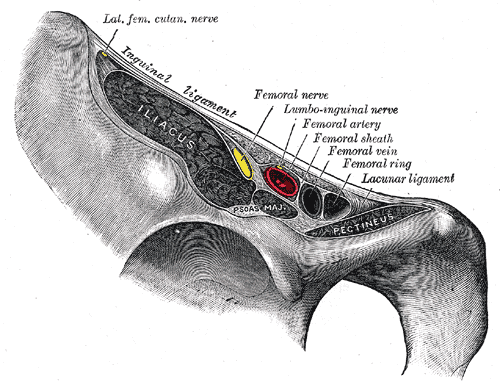
- Structures passing behind the inguinal ligament. Anterolateral view of the right side of the pelvis.

Details
- From: Anterior superior iliac spine
- To: Pubic tubercle

Identifiers
- Latin: ligamentum inguinale
- TA98: A04.5.01.009
- TA2: 2365
- FMA: 19855

The inguinal ligament (/ˈɪŋɡwɪnəl/), also known as Poupart's ligament or groin ligament, is a band running from the pubic tubercle to the anterior superior iliac spine. It forms the base of the inguinal canal through which an indirect inguinal hernia may develop. Additionally, the term "pubic ligament" is colloquially used to refer to the inguinal ligament.

== Structure ==
The inguinal ligament runs from the anterior superior iliac crest of the ilium to the pubic tubercle of the pubic bone. It is formed by the external abdominal oblique aponeurosis and is continuous with the fascia lata of the thigh.

There is some dispute over the attachments.

Structures that pass deep to the inguinal ligament include:

- Psoas major, iliacus, pectineus
- Femoral nerve, artery, and vein
- Lateral cutaneous nerve of thigh
- Lymphatics

== Function ==
The ligament serves to contain soft tissues as they course anteriorly from the trunk to the lower extremity. This structure demarcates the superior border of the femoral triangle. It demarcates the inferior border of the inguinal triangle.

The midpoint of the inguinal ligament, halfway between the anterior superior iliac spine and pubic tubercle, is the landmark for the femoral nerve. The mid-inguinal point, halfway between the anterior superior iliac spine and the pubic symphysis, is the landmark for the femoral artery. The external iliac arteries pass the inguinal ligament posteriorly and inferiorly.

== History ==
It is also referred to as Poupart's ligament, because François Poupart gave it relevance in relation to hernial repair, calling it "the suspender of the abdomen" (French: "le suspenseur de l'abdomen"). It is sometimes termed the Fallopian ligament. Colles' ligament is the reflex ligament and not the inguinal ligament.

== Additional images ==
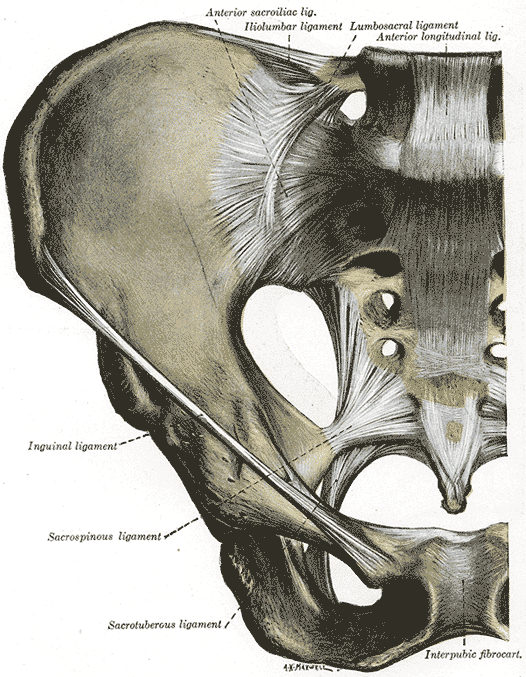
Ligaments of pelvis. Anterior view.

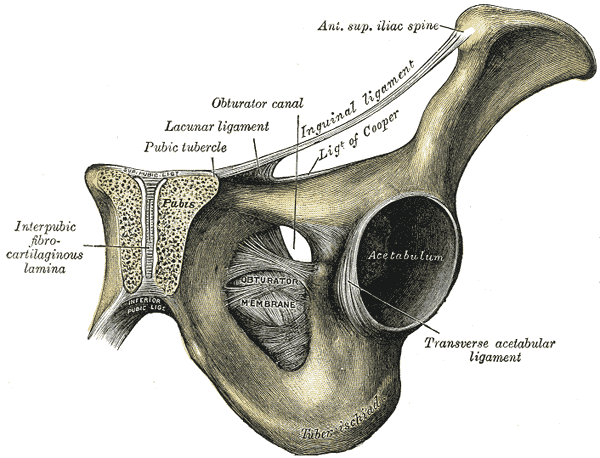

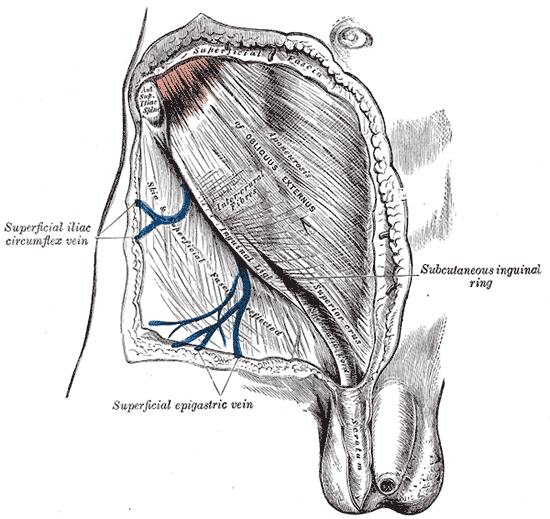
The subcutaneous inguinal ring.

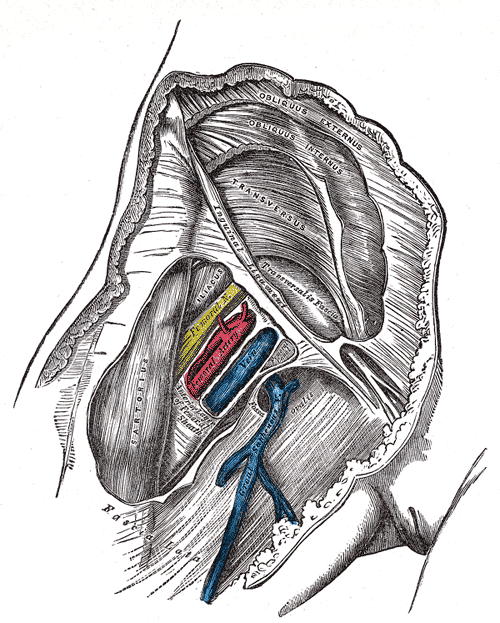
Femoral sheath laid open to show its three compartments.
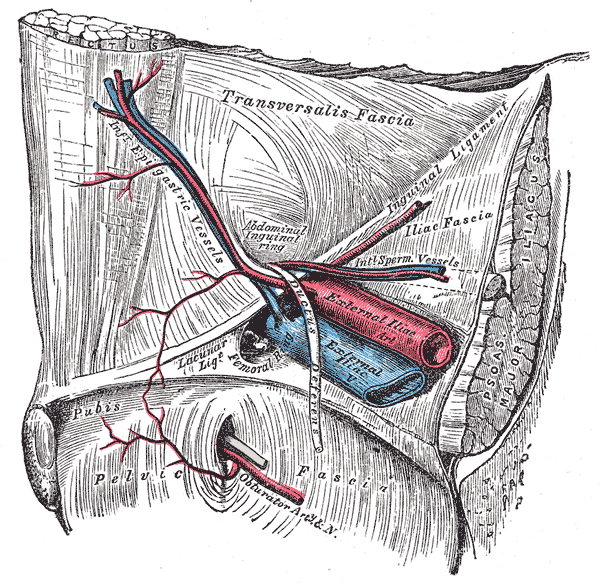
The relations of the femoral and abdominal inguinal rings, seen from within the abdomen. Right side.

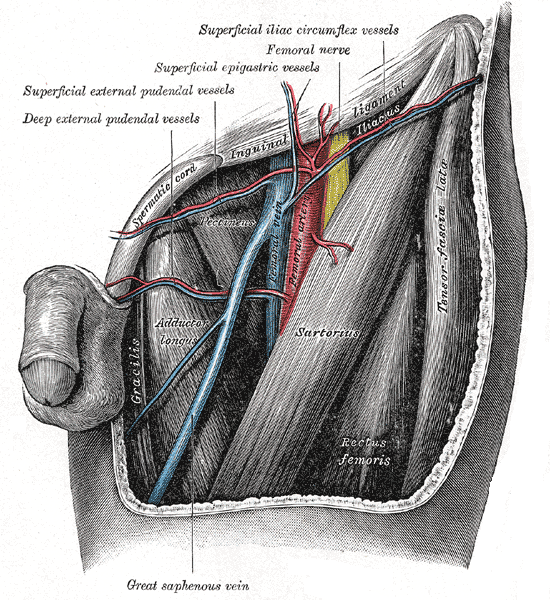
The left femoral triangle.

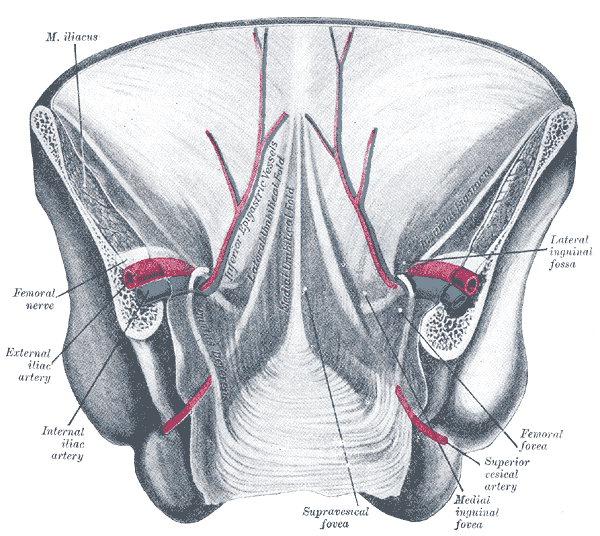
Posterior view of the anterior abdominal wall in its lower half. The peritoneum is in place, and the various cords are shining through.

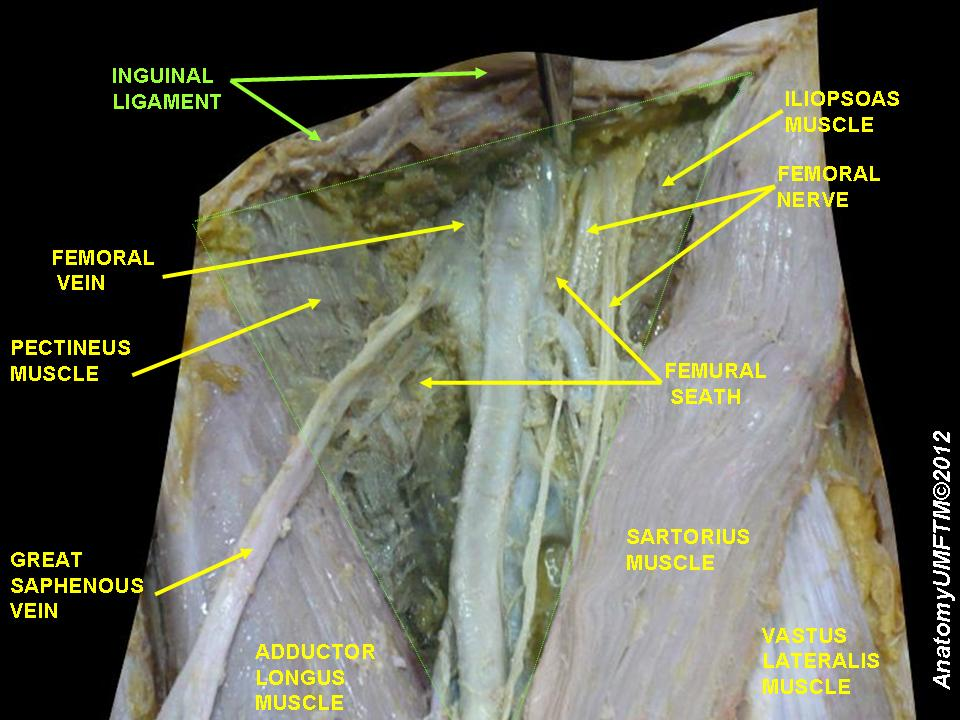
Inguinal ligament

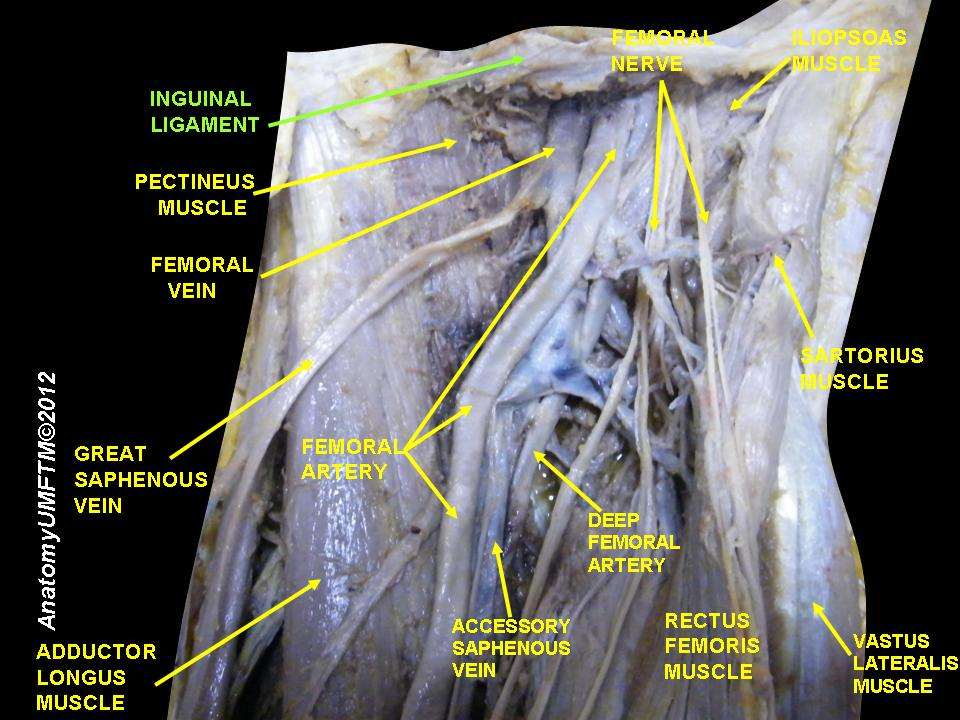
Inguinal ligament

== See also ==
- Pelvis
- Apollo's belt: surface features associated with the inguinal ligaments
