= Iliac fascia =

Fascia of the pelvis

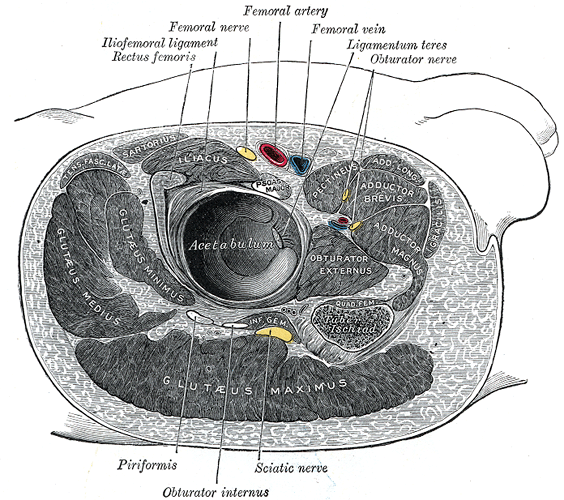
- Structures surrounding right hip-joint.

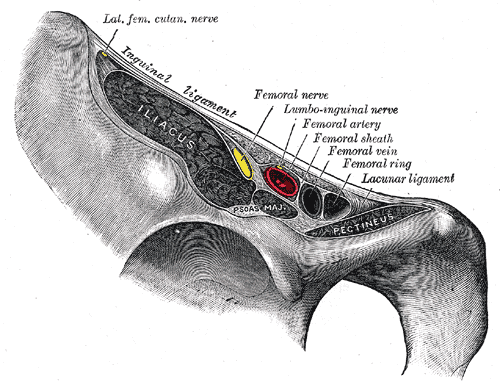
- Structures passing behind the inguinal ligament.

Details

Identifiers
- Latin: fascia iliaca
- TA98: A04.7.03.009
- TA2: 2388
- FMA: 18097

The iliac fascia (or Abernethy's fascia) is the fascia overlying the iliacus muscle.

Superiorly and laterally, the iliac fascia is attached to the inner aspect of the iliac crest; inferiorly and laterally, it extends into the thigh to unite with the femoral sheath; medially, it attaches to the periosteum of the ilium and iliopubic eminence near the linea terminalis, and blends with the psoas fascia and - over the quadratus lumborum muscle - with the anterior layer of thoracolumbar fascia.

The iliac fascia overlies the femoral nerve, and lateral femoral cutaneous nerve.

== Structure ==
It has the following connections:

- laterally, to the whole length of the inner lip of the iliac crest.
- medially, to the linea terminalis of the lesser pelvis, where it is continuous with the periosteum.

At the iliopectineal eminence it receives the tendon of insertion of the psoas minor, when that muscle exists.

Lateral to the femoral vessels it is intimately connected to the posterior margin of the inguinal ligament, and is continuous with the transversalis fascia.

Immediately lateral to the femoral vessels the iliac fascia is prolonged backward and medialward from the inguinal ligament as a band, the iliopectineal fascia, which is attached to the iliopectineal eminence.

This fascia divides the space between the inguinal ligament and the hip bone into two lacunæ or compartments:

- the medial vascular lacuna transmits the femoral vessels.
- the lateral muscular lacuna transmits the psoas major and Iliacus and the femoral nerve.

Medial to the vessels the iliac fascia is attached to the pectineal line behind the conjoint tendon, where it is again continuous with the transversalis fascia.

== See also ==
- Fascia iliaca block
