= Vascular lacuna =

Compartment beneath the inguinal ligament

The vascular lacuna (Latin: lacuna vasorum (retroinguinalis)) is the medial compartment beneath the inguinal ligament. It is separated from the lateral muscular lacuna by the iliopectineal arch. It gives passage to the femoral vessels, lymph vessels and lymph nodes.

The lacunar ligament can be a site of entrapment for femoral hernias.

== Anatomy ==
Its boundaries are the iliopectineal arch, the inguinal ligament, the lacunar ligament, and the superior border of the pubis.

=== Contents ===
The structures found in the vascular lacuna, from medial to lateral, are:

- Cloquet's node
- Femoral vein
- Femoral artery
- Femoral branch of the genitofemoral nerve
