= Neurectomy =

Surgical removal of a peripheral nerve

- Specialty: Neurology

A neurectomy, or nerve resection is a neurosurgical procedure in which a peripheral nerve is cut or removed to alleviate neuropathic pain or permanently disable some function of a nerve. The nerve is not intended to grow back. For chronic pain it may be an alternative to a failed nerve decompression when the target nerve has no motor function and numbness is acceptable. Neurectomies have also been used to permanently block autonomic function (e.g. excessive sweating in hands or involuntary muscle movement causing cramps), and special sensory function not related to pain (e.g. vestibular nerve dysfunction causing vertigo).

A temporary nerve block with an anesthetic is usually performed before surgery to confirm the diagnosis of neuropathic pain. Risks include numbness, neuroma, and complications due to lack of innervation.

== Procedures ==
=== Presacral neurectomy ===
A presacral neurectomy is typically conducted to decrease severe pain and menstrual cramps in the lower abdomen. Pain in this region is difficult to treat with noninvasive treatments. Endometriosis is the most common cause for this severe pain. One solution that doctors often mistakenly recommend as a cure is a hysterectomy, or removal of the uterus. However, this often does not relieve endometriosis pain because the disease is left behind on other organs such as the bladder, bowels, or pelvic side walls, and it can thrive on its own hormone supply. Another is to perform a presacral neurectomy. This is a procedure that interrupts the nerves going towards and/or around the uterus. Pain located on either side of the lower abdomen (but not mid line) should not be treated with a neurectomy. Only individuals with pain that is not relieved by the use of NSAIDs should consider this procedure. Techniques have been developed for this procedure to be performed laparoscopically.

The incision is typically directly under the navel. Normally three small holes are made in the lower abdomen to allow for the instruments and other various surgical tools. Nerve tissue that runs to the uterus is interrupted at the sacral promontory; a point at which spine and sacrum meet. This is the best area to access and obtain a clear view of the nerves in the uterus. Proper precautions must be taken as to avoid unnecessary complications with the major blood vessels surrounding the uterus. Some of the complications post-operation include urinary retention, as well as constipation. Neither has been reported to cause lasting effects.

Recent technological advances have allowed this same procedure to be done robotically, a minimally invasive technique similar to laparoscopy. The outcome of the procedure is identical to an open approach (laparotomy), but the incisions are much smaller allowing for less post-operation pain. Less pain following this surgery allows for a quicker recovery period too; two weeks as opposed to six weeks, on average.

=== Vestibular neurectomy ===
A vestibular neurectomy is an operation that severs the vestibular nerve, which contributes to balance, while sparing the cochlear nerve, which contributes to hearing. The procedure has the potential to relieve vertigo, but may preserve the ability to hear. This procedure will not reverse the effects of deafness. The risks include: hearing loss, tinnitus, dizziness, facial weakness, spinal fluid leak, and various infections. There are several different surgical approaches that can be used to complete this procedure: the middle cranial fossa, retrolabrynthine, retrosigmoid, and translabrynthine. The middle cranial fossa approach is one that most often requires neurosurgical expertise. The advantage of this procedure is that the vestibular nerve is clearly visible and can be sectioned without harming the cochlear nerve fibers.

The general procedure begins by positioning the patient supine with the head turned to the side with surgical ear upright. An incision is made at the lower portion of the zygomatic root to the area of the temporal region for roughly seven centimeters. Precautions are taken by clamping flaps of tissue as to not impede further actions. To expose the IAC (Inner Auditory Canal) properly, portions of bone from the metal fundus and also the tegmen tympani must be removed. The SVN (superior vestibular nerve) is then identified and cut at the point furthest from the vestibular crest. Along with the SVN, Scarpa's ganglion is also cut and removed.

In cases of Ménière's disease, a neurectomy may be needed when no other medical treatment is sufficient for over six months. In bilateral Ménière's disease, the procedure is done on the worse-off ear. Some procedures are done on both ears, but the risk of hearing loss then becomes significantly greater.

=== Pulsed radiofrequency ablation neurectomy ===
Some ablations that have been previously performed laparoscopically are also now offered via the pulsed radiofrequency technique. Pulsed radiofrequency ablation relies on delivering an electrical field specifically to neural tissue in order to damage it while minimizing injury to the surrounding area. For example, this technique has been used in patients with chronic shoulder pain as a way to perform a neurectomy of the suprascapular nerve with less risk of damage to nearby muscles within the rotator cuff. There is still a lack of evidence directly comparing the efficacy and safety of this technique compared to the traditional laparoscopic method, but there is evidence that it improves range of motion and pain compared to placebo or sham surgery.

=== Neurectomy for nerve entrapment ===
Neurectomy can be an alternative to a nerve decompression for nerve entrapment, such as when the nerves have no motor function and numbness along the dermatome is acceptable. A neurectomy is not a mutually exclusive option to a decompression as a neurectomy can also be used after a failed decompression.

There are many nerves in the human body that are purely sensory such as the cutaneous nerves, which provide innervation to all parts of the skin. The cutaneous nerves are especially susceptible to compression from wearables or injuries due to their superficial location. Some examples of wearable-induced irritation are supraorbital neuralgia from tight goggles, superficial radial neuropathy from handcuffs, and meralgia paresthetica from tight pants. As cutaneous nerves cover all areas of the skin, and any surgery which requires incisions may inadvertently cause injury or scarring, now entrapping a cutaneous nerve.

A common tradeoff when electing to a neurectomy is that numbness along the nerve distribution is expected. Studies that have measured how bothersome numbness is to patients have found that most patients are not bothered at all by the numbness, and the ones that are find the numbness minimally bothering.

==== Intercostal cutaneous nerve neurectomy ====
Intercostal neuralgia is a neuropathic condition that involves the intercostal nerves. The primary symptom is pain and it may be localized to the distribution of one or more of the intercostal nerves, manifesting as chest and abdominal pain. No treatment modality prior to neurectomy (e.g. systemic medications, cryoablation, therapeutic nerve blocks, and radioablation) has given effective pain relief and none have been curative.

The success outcome is typically measured as a 50% or more decrease in visual analog scale (VAS) scores, which are numerical pain scores from 0–10 or 0–100. Success rates are often reported as 70%. Studies reporting on intercostal neurectomy often report cure rates (100% reduction in symptoms), even though it is not the primary success outcome. For example, patients may say they are cured or report pain scores of zero. There is a wide span of the reported cure rates, ranging from 22–67%. A double-blind, randomized, controlled surgery trial found a 22% cure rate for the surgery group and a 4% cure rate for the sham surgery group, suggesting that these cure rates cannot be purely attributable to the natural history of the disease or a placebo effect.

==== Lateral femoral cutaneous nerve neurectomy ====
Lateral femoral cutaneous neuralgia, often known as Meralgia Paresthetica, involves neuropathic pain on the outer thigh. The use of a nerve decompression or neurectomy to treat nerve pain along the lateral femoral cutaneous nerve is a firmly established surgical treatment. However, the more effective treatment between a decompression and neurectomy is still being researched.

Between a nerve decompression and a neurectomy, the neurectomy is associated with a higher success rate which has been validated by two Cochrane reviews. The reviews found decompressions beneficial in 88% of cases and neurectomy beneficial in 94% of cases. A German national cohort study found similar results where complete pain relief from decompression was seen in 63% of cases but complete pain relief from neurectomy was seen in 85%.

== Use in horses ==
Neurectomy is also used in equine medicine, primarily for cases of persistent lameness that is non-responsive to other forms of treatment. It is most commonly used for animals with navicular syndrome and suspensory ligament desmitis.

== See also ==
- nerve block
- nerve compression syndrome
- nerve decompression
