= Inguinal glands =

Inguinal glands may refer to,

- Scent glands in even-toed ungulates
- Inguinal lymph nodes
