= Schwatrz's test =

Schwartz's test
- Purpose: Diagnosis of varicose veins

Schwartz's test is a clinical test used for confirming the diagnosis of long standing varicose veins. The clinician exposes the lower limb. A tap is made on the lower part of the leg on the long saphenous varicose vein with one hand. If an impulse can be felt at the saphenous opening with the other hand, Schwartz's test is positive. The impulse is felt at the saphenous opening because of the incompetence of the valves in the superficial venous system.
