= Pubic ligament =

Pubic ligament can refer to:

- Inferior pubic ligament (ligamentum pubicum inferius)
- Superior pubic ligament (ligamentum pubicum superius)
- Pectineal ligament or Cooper's pubic ligament (ligamentum pectineum)
