= Nerve decompression =

Surgical procedure relieving nerve pressure

A nerve decompression is a neurosurgical procedure to relieve chronic, direct pressure on a nerve to treat nerve entrapment, a pain syndrome characterized by severe chronic pain and muscle weakness. In this way a nerve decompression targets the underlying pathophysiology of the syndrome and is considered a first-line surgical treatment option for peripheral nerve pain. Despite treating the underlying cause of the disease, the symptoms may not be fully reversible as delays in diagnosis can allow permanent damage to occur to the nerve and surrounding microvasculature. Traditionally only nerves accessible with open surgery have been good candidates, however innovations in laparoscopy and nerve-sparing techniques made nearly all nerves in the body good candidates, as surgical access is no longer a barrier.

== Surgical planning ==
Surgical planning is distinct from diagnosis of entrapment. Diagnosis will focus on a binary decision: does the patient have entrapment or not? A diagnosis may not be enough information for surgery on its own as the area to explore may be too large. Surgical planning seeks to localize the specific area of entrapment to improve surgical outcomes. Identifying the level of entrapment is an important consideration for surgery as decompressing the wrong area will lead to a failed surgery (e.g. performing back surgery for extra-spinal sciatica), failure to treat nerve entrapment early can lead to permanent nerve injury, and the patient may be unnecessarily exposed to surgical complications.

=== Diagnostic blocks ===
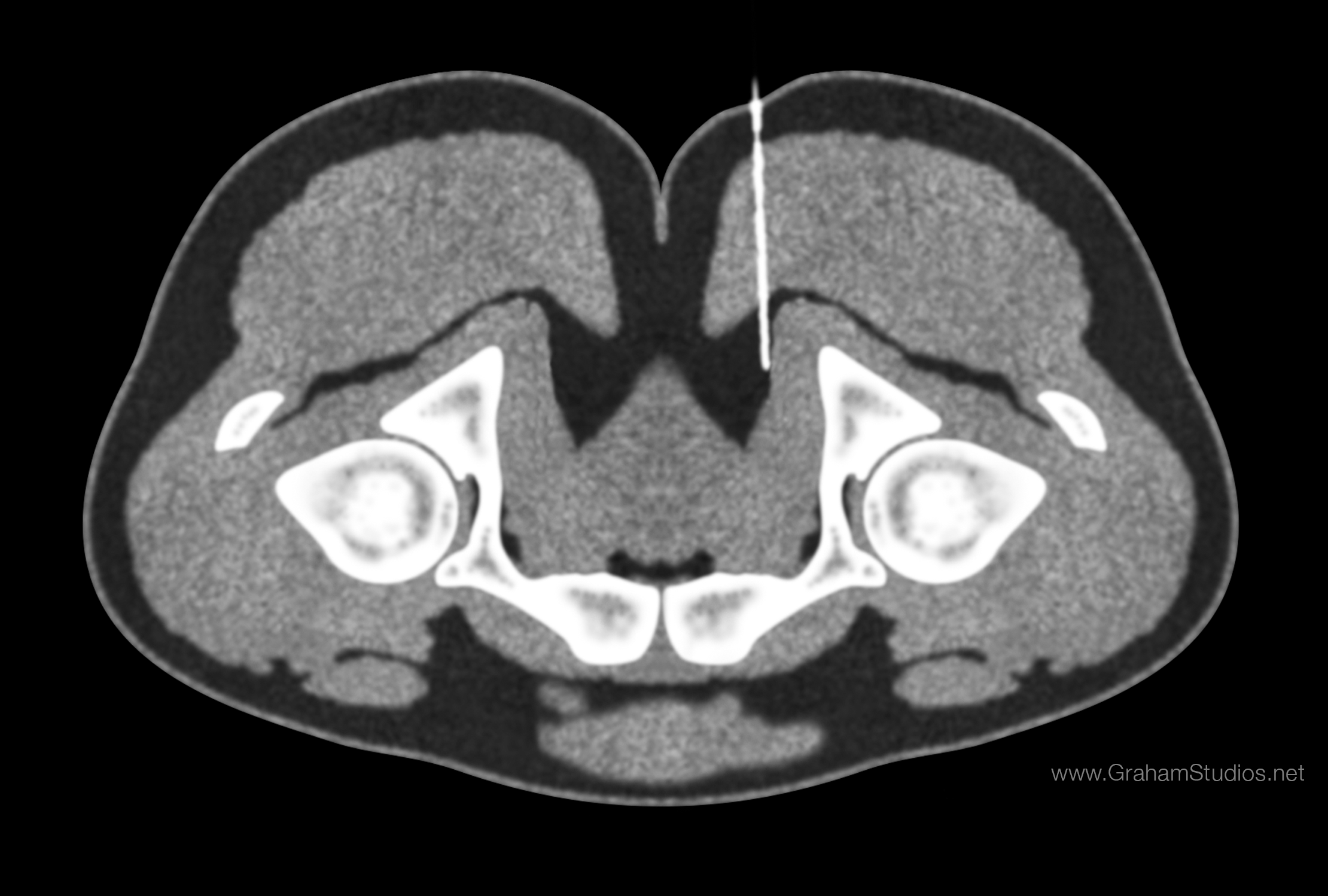
Illustration of a CT image-guided injection of the pudendal nerve at the pudendal canal

Diagnostic nerve blocks can confirm the clinical diagnosis for chronic pain as well as identify the entrapment site. A diagnostic block is like an inverted palpation in the sense that palpation will cause a sensory nerve to send a signal (action potential) and a block will prevent a sensory nerve from sending a signal. By blocking nerve signals, the pain-contributing nerves can be identified or ruled out. Nerves are predisposed to entrapment in certain anatomical regions such as in an osteofibrous tunnels, through a muscle, adjacent to fibrous tissue. Consequently, knowledge of these anatomical regions as well as peripheral nerve anatomy is an essential component to planning successful diagnostic blocks. Ultrasound is a common form of image-guidance to place the needle properly, but it faces limitations visualizing small and deep nerves. CT- or MRI- guidance are better positioned to access deep nerves as well as identify the anatomic level of the needle.

=== Imaging ===
MRI may be used to identify certain causes of entrapment such as a structural lesions pressing on a nearby nerve, but is prone to false negatives/positives and has poor correlation with the clinical examination. A major limitation with MRI is that nerve tissue is resistant to imaging. An advancement of MRI that takes advantage of the tissue properties of nerves, called MR neurography (MRN), provides more detail. MR tractography (MRT) can also be of use in surgical planning as it can identify peripheral nerve abnormalities with a high correlation to intraoperative findings and has higher accuracy than MR neurography alone. MRT uses diffusion tensor imaging to visualize the directional movement of water molecules along nerve tracts. Often an abnormality can be identified along tracts of nerve where water is not diffusing normally along the axis. MRT has been used to identify sacral nerve entrapment by the piriformis muscle, which would otherwise only be diagnosable with exploratory surgery.

== List of surgeries ==
A non-exhaustive list of nerve decompression surgeries includes

- discectomy for spinal disc herniation
- laminectomy for cauda equina syndrome
- microvascular decompression for trigeminal neuralgia
- multiple nerve decompression surgery for diabetic peripheral neuropathy
- migraine surgery for migraines
- piriformis muscle release for piriformis syndrome
- sciatic nerve decompression for deep gluteal syndrome
- pudendal nerve decompression for pudendal neuralgia
- lateral femoral cutaneous nerve (LFCN) decompression for meralgia paresthetica
- sacral plexus decompression for intrapelvic nerve entrapments
- brachial plexus decompression, scalenectomy, first rib resection, and clavicle resection for thoracic outlet syndrome

== Surgical outcomes ==
Nerve decompressions are still a relatively new surgery, however a picture emerges from looking at the outcomes of some of the most studied nerve decompressions: carpal tunnel release, sciatic nerve decompression, and migraine surgery. Even within these commonly performed surgeries, the measurement of outcomes is not always standardized. Common ways of measuring outcomes are syndrome-specific disability questionnaires (e.g. Boston Carpal Tunnel Questionnaire, Oswestry low back disability questionnaire, and the migraine disability assessment); visual analog scale (VAS); physical examination findings; and subjective patient satisfaction.

=== Carpal tunnel release ===
Carpal tunnel surgery has a clinical success rate of 75-90%. Success is most frequently measured with the Boston Carpal Tunnel Questionnaire, physical examination (sensory function, motor function, pain, electrodiagnostic, trophic function), and patient self-assessments. One study found that while 86% of patients improved, only 26% had complete recovery of clinical and electrodiagnostic findings. Of the functional assessments, pain showed the greatest improvements following surgery. Another study compared carpal tunnel syndrome patients who elected surgery with those who chose not to. 77% of the surgery group said they were cured compared to 16% who did not elect surgery. While some of the success of surgery may just be due to the natural history of the disease, the surgery groups still have an improvement in outcomes over conservative measures. A systematic review found that surgical treatment outweighed the benefits over conservative treatment overall all outcome measures, however conservative treatment caused fewer complications.

=== Sciatic nerve decompression ===
A systematic review has found that 90% of surgery patients see improved pain scores with scores improving on average from 6.7 preoperatively to 2.1 postoperatively. In the literature, the most common outcome measurement for sciatic nerve decompressions is the visual analog scale, where patients rate their pain on a 100mm horizontal line that gets converted into a numeric score from 0-10 or 0–100. The main disability questionnaires used are the modified Harris Hip score (mHHS) and the Oswestry low back disability questionnaire. One study found that all deep gluteal syndrome surgery patients who were taking narcotics for pre-operative pain (n = 21) no longer needed narcotics for the initial complaint after decompression surgery.

=== Migraine surgery ===
A systematic review has found that the improvement is seen in 68-100% of surgery patients and complete migraine elimination is seen in 8-86% of surgery patients. The outcomes are usually measured in migraine intensity, frequency, and duration (an early measurement, the migraine headache index, was just the product of these numerical values). The most common migraine disability questionnaires are the migraine disability assessment (MIDAS), headache impact test (HIT), and migraine specific quality of life questionnaire (MSQ).

One randomized study compared the efficacy of migraine surgery to pharmacologic treatment and found that surgical treatment had a significantly higher success rate than medical treatment. Notably, 36% of patients in the surgical treatment group experienced complete elimination of migraine headaches, compared to and 4% in the medical treatment group. Another randomized study compared surgery to sham surgery. 57% of the surgery group experienced complete elimination of migraine headaches, compared on only 4% of the sham surgery group. A separate study examining outcomes found that there was a bimodal distribution (two main outcomes), where approximately >80% of patients saw either at least an 80% reduction in symptoms or less than 5% reduction. Of the patients seeing significant improvement, the mean improvement was 96%. Of the patients seeing minimal improvement, the average improvement was 0%.

Paying special attention to complete elimination of migraines or measuring outcomes after long follow ups (e.g. years) may be important for assessing the efficacy of migraine surgery because headache research has found a strong placebo effect. A large meta-analysis found that the placebo effect in acute migraine treatments was greatly reduced when the treatment outcome was "pain-free" (9% of patients) compared to "improved" (30% of patients). Studies that have compared migraine surgery to a control group have found similarly low placebo cure rates, both at 4%.

== Complications ==
Complications can be perioperative or postoperative. Among the generic set of surgical complications such as bleeding, infection, scarring, complications from general anesthesia, etc. nerve decompressions come with a risk of nerve injury. A nerve can be directly injured due to transection (cutting), traction (pulling), crush injuries (squeezing), destroying a blood vessel that supplied the nerve, etc. While nerve sparing techniques have been developed to mitigate nerve injury, the radical nature of decompression surgeries cannot eliminate the risk.

In a large national study of carpal tunnel decompression postoperative complications, the serious complications seen were wound dehiscence, wound infection, tendon injury, and neurovascular injury. Serious postoperative complications, defined as requiring re-admittance to a hospital within 90 days, was relatively rare, at 0.1% over approximately 850,000 surgeries.

Endoscopic sciatic nerve decompression has similarly low rates of complication. Two studies with a combined 95 patients found no complications. A systematic review also found a 0% major complication rate and a 1% minor complication rate for the endoscopic approach.

A systematic review on migraine surgeries found a major complication rate of 1% and a liberal estimate on the minor complication rate of approximately 32%. The most common complications were numbness/paresthesia and itching. Another systematic review found the adverse event rate to be 11.6%. One of the challenges in cataloging the complication rate of migraine surgery is that it's a relatively new surgery and so the surgical treatment can be extremely heterogeneous across different surgeons (e.g. remove artery, remove muscle, decompress nerve, remove nerve all across one or more trigger sites).

== Other procedures ==
An alternative to a decompression is a nerve resection. When the nerve does not have any motor fibres and loss of sensation is acceptable, removing the nerve in its entirety may be a more "complete" solution as it will address a much wider dermatome (all distal nerve fibres from the point of excision). Nerve decompressions, in contrast, cannot explore the entire course of a nerve and all its branches and so may potentially miss the true entrapment point. For this reason, a nerve resection may be considered after a failed decompression. Examples of nerves that may be good candidates for resection are lateral femoral cutaneous nerve, zygomaticotemporal branch of the trigeminal nerve, the posterior femoral cutaneous nerve, and the middle/superior cluneal nerves.

It's not clear whether a nerve resection is superior to a nerve decompression when both treatments may be suitable. A study on occipital neuralgia in 2017 found that there was not enough data to make a determination. A study on Meralgia Paraesthetica found higher success rates for nerve resection and that most patients were not bothered by numbness following the procedure.

== History ==
The treatment of each peripheral nerve entrapment has its own history, making any single narrative incomplete.

The symptoms of nerve injury in the early 1900s were called nerve palsy (today neuropathy or neuritis are more common terms). The concept of injuries causing nerve palsy was understood at that time. For example, wrist fractures were known to be a cause of nerve palsy through compression, and this could be treated by liberating the nerve. It was freeing the nerve after post-traumatic injuries that early nerve decompressions occurred. However, non-traumatic causes of nerve palsy were less clear, in some cases having no known explanation (idiopathic). The development of carpal tunnel syndrome to explain idiopathic tardy median nerve palsy formalized the concept of nerve compression at anatomic areas of narrowing, and influenced the development of other tunnel syndromes. This expanded the indications for nerve decompression both to idiopathic neuropathies as well as many parts of the body that exhibited anatomic areas of narrowing in the vicinity of a nerve.

Nerve decompressions have benefited from advances in technology and peripheral nerve surgery. For example, use of the operating microscope (surgery that uses this microscope is now known as microsurgery) was important to the development of the Jannetta procedure for trigeminal neuralgia. Endoscopic surgery was an important advancement, as this allowed greatly expanded surgical access compared to open surgery. In particular, endoscopic surgery gave much better access to the pudendal nerve as well as the sciatic nerve, and allowed the possibility of decompressing the sacral plexus. The use of image-guided diagnostic nerve blocks provided better capabilities to identify the entrapped nerve as well as the site of entrapment, leading to more accurate diagnosis and reducing the need for surgical exploration. The use of magnetic resonance neurography (MRN) and diffusion tensor imaging (DTI) have allowed better visualization of nerves, at times identifying the site of entrapment without the need for extensive surgical exploration. Robot-assisted surgery is still in the early stages, not yet achieving widespread use for nerve decompressions or even for peripheral nerve surgery, however it can provide dexterity, precision, and stability not possible by hand.

1878: first ulnar nerve decompression. However, it did not gain much traction at the time.

1933: first published carpal tunnel surgery for post-traumatic compression

1946: first carpal tunnel surgery for idiopathic compression

1958: cubital tunnel surgery described

1962: tarsal tunnel surgery described

1967: Janetta procedure for trigeminal neuralgia

1989: endoscopic carpal tunnel surgery

1992: Magnetic resonance neurography described. First clinical study on nerve decompressions to relieve symptoms of diabetic peripheral neruopathy.

1994: Diffusion tensor imaging described

1997 endoscopic pudendal nerve decompression

2000: correlation found between brow lifts and migraine reduction. This is the precursor to modern migraine surgery.

2003: arthroscopic piriformis muscle release

2005: Magnetic resonance neurography and image-guided injections used in a clinical research study to improve nerve decompression outcomes

2010: endoscopic sciatic nerve decompression

2015: laparoscopic sacral plexus decompression; robotic pudendal nerve decompression

== Society and culture ==
=== Controversy ===
Surgical nerve decompression has caused controversy across various medical specialties. The controversy is generally over the interpretation of available evidence and quality of evidence necessary to consider nerve decompression as a valid treatment option for specific diseases/syndromes.

==== Critics ====
Critics generally believe the results of specific nerve decompression surgeries are attributable to either the placebo effect (patient expectations influencing outcomes) or natural history (patients getting better on their own). Critics sometimes reject the validity of nerve decompression surgery because the thesis of nerve compression conflicts with preexisting theories about how certain diseases work. In diabetic peripheral neuropathy (treatable in some cases with multiple nerve decompressions) and migraines (migraine surgery is a nerve decompression), critics dispute the interpretation of the results because the majority of studies are of retrospective case series (reports of surgeries performed in the past) rather than prospective randomized controlled trials (RCTs), and so any positive results of surgery could be influenced by methodological flaws such as lack of proper control groups. Critics may believe that given the lack of RCTs on nerve decompression surgery, and the known risk of surgical complications (however small), nerve decompression should not be recommended.

==== Proponents ====
Proponents have alleged that the success of treating previously untreatable patients validates decompression as a treatment. That RCTs in surgical research have ethical issues, as a proper control group would receive a placebo surgery and be exposed to surgical complications. That prospective RCTs should not be the only way to reason about whether a therapy is effective given the challenges in using RCTs to study surgery (a suggested alternative is to compare surgery to the best existing treatments). That potential bias in existing studies doesn't account for the large, reproducible effects of nerve decompression, so the results should not be discounted just because the studies aren't RCTs. That the improvement from surgery is clearly much larger than the studied magnitude of the placebo effect, and so cannot be explained by it. That suggesting surgery is placebo is a double standard when these same treatment-resistant patients do not benefit from the placebo effect of failed non-surgical treatments and even prior failed surgical treatments. Proponents have noted that nerve compressions are seen in many other nerves, and that we should expect to see some number of patients with entrapments of any given peripheral nerve. Proponents have asserted that some critics have gone beyond healthy skepticism, exaggerated proponents' claims, argued against positions the proponents did not make, levied non-constructive criticism, and misinterpreted the placebo effect in ways not supported by peer-reviewed research.

== See also ==
- Arthroscopy
- Endoscopy
- Laparoscopy
- Nerve compression syndrome
- Nerve block
- Neurectomy
- Spinal decompression
