= Georg Lotheissen =

Austrian surgeon

Georg Lotheissen (September 14, 1868 – October 28, 1941) was an Austrian surgeon born in Geneva, Switzerland.

In 1892 he earned his medical doctorate in Vienna, and following graduation was an assistant to Emil Zuckerkandl (1849–1910), and a surgical apprentice under Theodor Billroth (1829–1894) and Carl Gussenbauer (1842–1903). From 1895 to 1901, he served as first assistant to Viktor von Hacker (1852–1933) at the surgical clinic at Innsbruck, where in 1899 he received his habilitation in surgery. In 1902 he returned to Vienna, where in 1915 he became an associate professor.

Lotheissen made important contributions in his work involving esophageal surgery and hernia repair. In 1897, he was the first surgeon to suture the conjoint tendon to Cooper's (pectineal) ligament, an operation he performed on a patient with a recurrent inguinal hernia. Decades later, American surgeon Chester McVay (1911–1987) popularized the operation, and this procedure is now referred to as a Lotheissen-McVay herniotomy. His name is also associated with Lotheissen's operation, sometimes known as Lotheissen's transinguinal approach. This surgery involves operating for femoral hernia through the posterior wall of the inguinal canal.
