= Vladimir Karlovich Roth =

Russian neuropathologist (1848–1916)

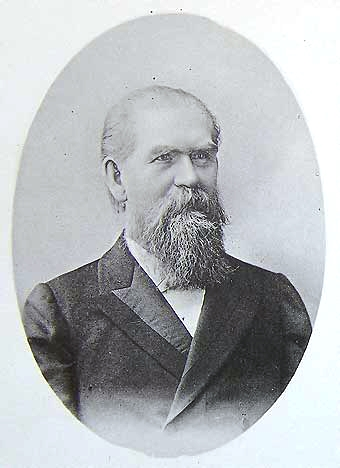

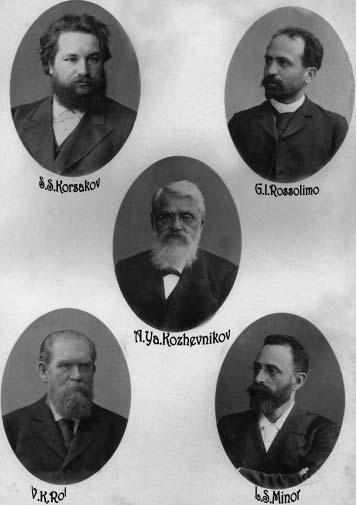
Tableau depicting Moscow neurologists, Roth at the bottom left

Vladimir Karlovich Roth or Rot (Russian: Владимир Карлович Рот; 5 October 1848 – 6 January 1916) was a Russian neuropathologist.

== Life ==
Roth was native of Orel. He studied medicine at the University of Moscow, where he graduated in 1871. From 1877 to 1879 he traveled abroad, working in clinics at Vienna, Berlin and Paris. From 1881 until 1890, he served as head of the department of nervous diseases at the Staro-Ekaterininskii hospital in Moscow, where he also opened a school of nursing. In 1895 he attained the title of "professor extraordinarius", and from 1902 to 1911, he held the chair of neurological diseases at Moscow University.

In 1895, Roth described meralgia paraesthetica (Bernhardt-Roth syndrome), a disease characterized by numbness or pain in the outer thigh, caused by an injury of the lateral cutaneous nerve of thigh. This condition is sometimes referred to as "Bernhardt-Roth paraesthesia", named in conjunction with German neuropathologist Martin Bernhardt (1844–1915), who described the disorder independent of Roth.
