= Martin Bernhardt =

German neuropathologist (1844–1915)

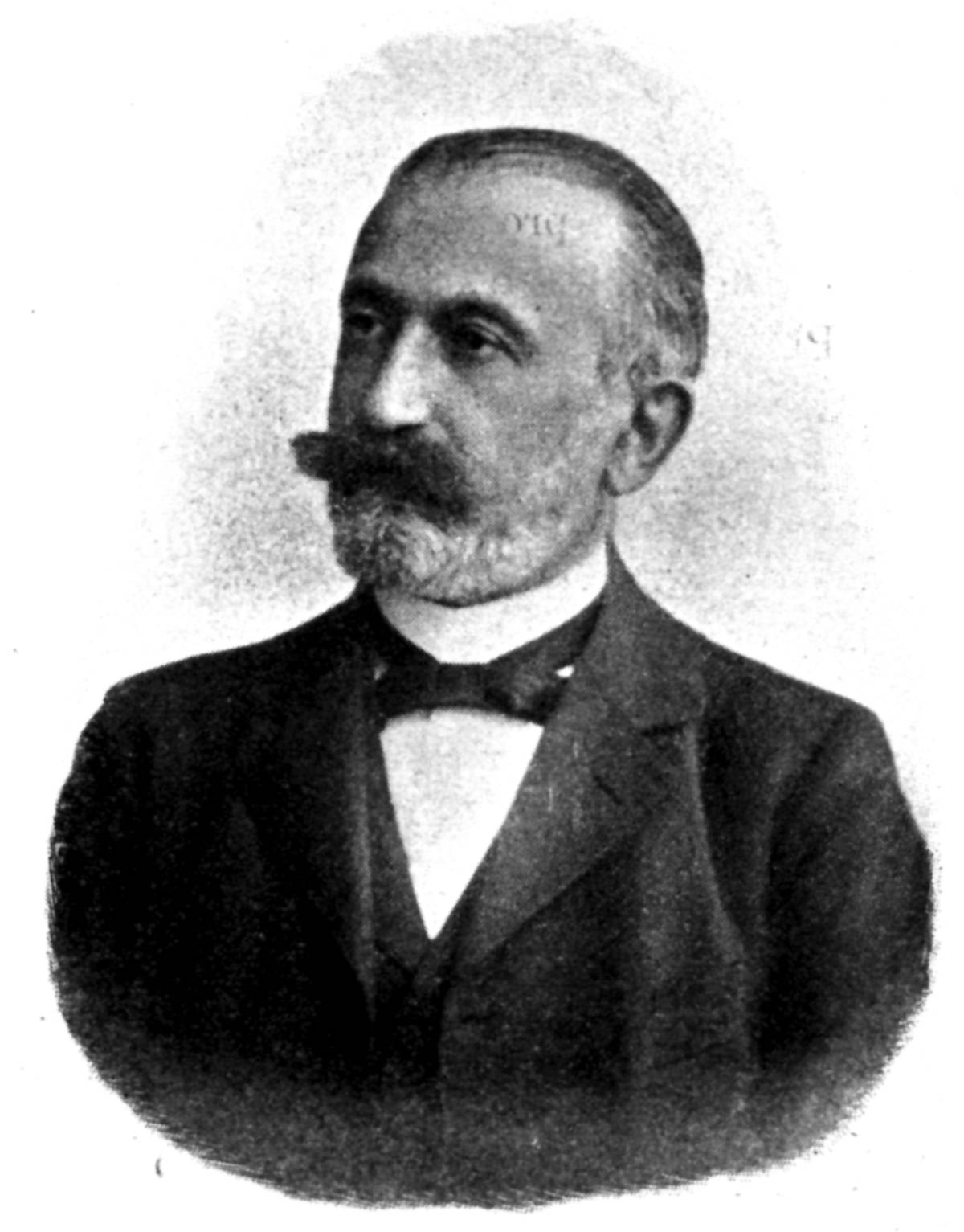
- Martin Bernhardt
- Born: 10 April 1844; Potsdam
- Died: 17 March 1915 (aged 70); Berlin
- Education: University of Berlin
- Known for: meralgia paraesthetica
- Scientific career
- Fields: Neuropathology
- Workplaces: University of Berlin

Martin Bernhardt (10 April 1844 – 17 March 1915) was a German neuropathologist.

Bernhardt was a native of Potsdam. His family was Jewish. In 1867 he received his medical doctorate at the University of Berlin, where he was a student of Rudolf Virchow (1821–1902) and Ludwig Traube (1818–1878). Subsequently, he became an assistant to Ernst Viktor von Leyden (1832–1910) at the university clinic at Königsberg, and afterwards worked at the Berlin-Charité under Karl Friedrich Otto Westphal (1833–1890). After military service in the Franco-Prussian War, he returned to Berlin as a specialist in neuropathology, and in 1882 attained the title of "professor extraordinarius".

Bernhardt published several treatises on neurological diseases and electrotherapy, and in 1885 became editor-in-chief of the Centralblatt für die Medizinischen Wissenschaften. With Russian neuropathologist Vladimir Karlovich Roth (1848–1916), the eponymous "Bernhardt-Roth paraesthesia" is named. This condition is also referred to as meralgia paraesthetica, and is characterized by numbness or pain in the outer thigh that is caused by injury to the lateral femoral cutaneous nerve.

Bernhardt is credited as one of the first neurologists to describe what is now known as the Vulpian-Bernhardt Syndrome, a regional variant of ALS.

Associated eponym:

- Bernhardt's formula : A formula used to calculate an adult's ideal weight in kilograms; it is found by measuring a person's height in centimeters, times his/her chest circumference in centimeters and dividing by 240.

== Selected publications ==
- Die Sensibilitätsverhältnisse der Haut; 1873
- Beiträge zur Symptomatologie und Diagnostik der Hirngeschwülste; 1881
- Electricitätslehre für Mediziner und Elektrotherapie 1884, in collaboration with Isidor Rosenthal (1836-1915).
- Erkrankungen der Peripherischen Nerven; 1895–1897.
