= Meralgia paraesthetica =

Meralgia paresthetica
- Other names: Bernhardt-Roth syndrome
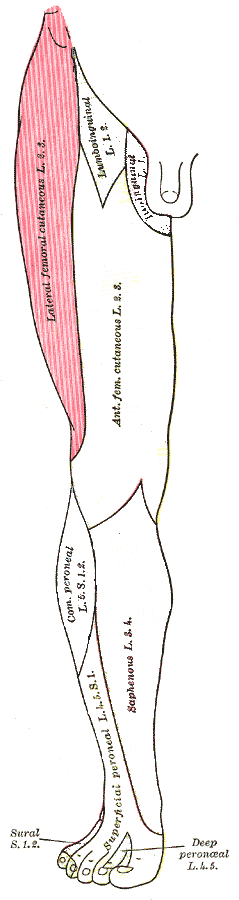
- Innervation of lateral cutaneous nerve of the thigh (shaded area) on the right leg.
- Specialty: Neurology
- Symptoms: Pain, dysthesias, paresthesias, and hyperesthesia on the anterolateral thigh
- Causes: Anything that compresses the lateral femoral cutaneous nerve, such as tight fitting clothes at the waist and injuries.
- Risk factors: Obesity, pregnancy, diabetes, middle-age
- Diagnostic method: Clinical examination and patient history
- Differential diagnosis: Lumbar L2/L3 pathology, lumbar plexopathy, another entrapped peripheral nerve, and pelvic tumors
- Treatment: Steroid injections, nerve decompression, and neurectomy

Meralgia paresthetica or meralgia paraesthetica is pain or abnormal sensations in the outer thigh not caused by injury to the thigh, but by injury to a nerve which provides sensation to the lateral thigh.

Meralgia paresthetica is a specific instance of nerve entrapment. The nerve involved is the lateral femoral cutaneous nerve (LFCN). The symptoms are purely sensory because the LFCN has no motor function. This syndrome can be caused by anything which places prolonged pressure on the LFCN, such as wearing a tight belt. The diagnosis is typically done via clinical examination and patient history, followed by a diagnostic nerve block. The condition will often resolve on its own within two years even without treatment. Non-surgical treatments include lifestyle changes, physical therapy, and therapeutic injections. Surgical treatments include nerve decompression and neurectomy.

== Anatomy ==
The lateral femoral cutaneous nerve (LFCN) originates from the lumbar plexus and contains fibers from lumbar nerves L2 and L3. The LFCN then traverses to the lateral border of the psoas major muscle, crosses the iliacus muscle, and continues to the anterior superior iliac spine (bony landmark). The nerve then passes between inguinal ligament (passes under) and sartorius muscle (passes over). It then divides into an anterior and posterior branch as it travels into the thigh.

== Signs and symptoms ==
The lateral femoral cutaneous nerve (LFCN) is a purely sensory nerve, and consequently the symptoms are also sensory. Symptoms are typically unilateral, seen in about 78% of cases, but may be bilateral.

The most common symptom is pain, paresthesias, or dysthesias on the anterolateral surface of the thigh that extends just above the knee. (The term "meralgia paraesthetica" combines four Greek roots to mean "thigh pain with abnormal sensations".) Examples of paresthesias (abnormal sensations but not unpleasant) and dysthesias (abnormal sensations that are unpleasant) are burning, tingling, numbness, stinging, hypersensitivity, and itching. The symptom intensity can be mild to severe in a way that limits function due to pain.

Activity and position can affect the symptoms. For example, symptoms may be exacerbated by standing or prolonged hip extension, with relief when sitting or flexing the hip. Sometimes strenuous exercise may exacerbate symptoms.

== Causes ==
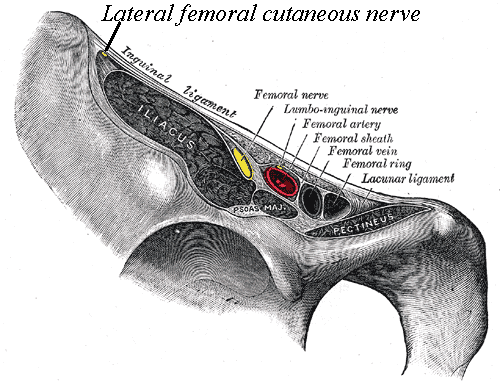
Lateral cutaneous nerve of thigh and other structures passing between the left inguinal ligament and ilium, frontolateral view of the right side of the pelvis.

The cause of Meralgia Paresthetica (MP) is nerve compression or injury to the lateral femoral cutaneous nerve (LFCN).

The site of compression is often at or near the inguinal ligament as the LFCN passes between the upper front hip bone (ilium) and the inguinal ligament near the attachment at the anterior superior iliac spine (the upper point of the hip bone).

Causes of compression can be due to tight fitting clothing at the waist, tight belts, or tight seat belts placing pressure on the LFCN. It can also be due to conditions which increase intra-abdominal volume and consequently pressure on the LFCN such as ascites, obesity, and pregnancy. Less commonly, anything that directly presses on the LFCN anywhere along its course, such a tumor or cyst, can also be a cause. Meralgia Paresthetica can also be caused by accidents that cause injury to the LFCN such as a seat belt injury from a car accident. Iatrogenic injuries to the LFCN are also possible and can happen due to peri-operative positioning or spinal, pelvic, and abdominal operations. In cases where MP is elicited by strenuous physical activity, it's thought that anatomic variations may predispose the LFCN to compression with certain limb movements.

== Pathophysiology ==
Anatomic variations in the course of the lateral femoral cutaneous nerve (LFCN) through the inguinal ligament, its branching level, and course through the thigh is thought to predispose the LFCN to nerve damage through injury or nerve compression.

== Diagnosis ==
Diagnosis is generally based on clinical examination and patient history. The clinical examination may include checking the region that the patient is reporting paresthetias/dysthesias as well as sensory differences between each leg if the symptoms are unilateral. Patient history might include relevant details about recent surgeries, injuries, lifestyle activities that could irritate the nerve.

In typical cases a nerve block is performed. In a nerve block, an anesthetic injection near the nerve numbs the entire nerve to confirm lateral femoral cutaneous nerve (LFCN) involvement and also to distinguish it from lumbosacral root pain. The nerve block test of the LFCN is considered positive if the patient has immediate symptom relief lasting 30–40 minutes after the injection.

Atypical presentations involve an extended workup that involves imaging, electrophysiology testing, neurosonography to rule out similar conditions with overlapping symptoms (differential diagnoses). Some differential diagnoses include L2/L3 lumbar radiculopathy, another entrapped peripheral nerve (e.g. femoral neuropathy), lumbar plexopathy, abdominal masses, and pelvic tumors.

A lumbar MRI can rule out lumbar radiculopathy. Imaging like MRI/CT/x-ray can be used to rule out mass lesions (e.g. tumors) that could compress the LFCN. Magnetic resonance neurography (MRN) can be used to assess signal alterations along the LFCN. Neurophysiological testing can include sensory nerve conduction studies or somatosensory evoked potentials. Image-guided nerve blocks can be used to rule out the involvement of other nerves.

== Treatment ==
Meralgia Paresthetica is typically a self-limiting condition with spontaneous remission. In one study evaluating the natural history of Meralgia Paresthetica, 62% of patients with no treatment had complete symptom resolution after 2 years. The limitation in existing treatment data is that there are no randomized control trials, much of the data is observational, and it is difficult to distinguish the effectiveness of a treatment from the natural history of the disease (how the disease progresses without treatment). Active Release Therapy has helped to free adhesions which may lead to Impingement as well.

=== Conservative ===
Conservative therapy seeks to reduce aggravating factors. This includes eliminating tight fitting clothing and tight belts, losing weight, avoiding activities that aggravate symptoms, and physical therapy to stretch the muscles and tendons present along the course of the lateral femoral cutaneous nerve.

Medications can be used for symptomatic treatment. Examples include NSAIDs, topical capsaicin, and lidocaine gel/patches for epidermal hypersensitivity or dysesthesia.

Nerve blocks can also be used therapeutically especially if combined with corticosteroids. The relief from steroid injections is highly variable, with long-term, complete pain relief of approximately 22%. The revision rate for injections is approximately 81% and a revision is likely to either be a repeat injection or a nerve decompression.

An emerging non-surgical treatment is radiofrequency ablation to destroy the lateral femoral cutaneous nerve.

=== Surgical ===
If repeated nerve blocks don't lead to symptom improvement, then surgery is recommended.

The main surgical treatments for Meralgia Paresthetica are nerve decompression and neurectomy. The main difference between the decompression and neurectomy is that the decompression will remove material around the nerve which might compress it, while the neurectomy removes the nerve itself. By keeping the nerve intact, a decompression preserves sensation. With a neuroectomy, there will be permanent numbness distal to the site of transaction because the nerve is transected and removed. However, in studies measuring patient quality of life, patients seem to be rarely bothered by the loss of sensation.

While both procedures are effective, the neurectomy has better outcomes on complete pain relief. In a systematic review, complete pain relief was seen in 85% of neurectomy cases and 63% of decompression cases. A Cochrane review found that complete pain relief in 85-100% of neurectomy cases and 60-99% of decompression cases. The revision rate for nerve decompression is 12% and a revision was either a repeat decompression or neurectomy. The revision rate for neurectomy is approximately 0%.

One systematic review found that the complication rate after neurectomy is 0%, and after neurolysis is 5%. The most common complications after either surgery is hematomas, subcutaneous effusions, wound healing disorders, and wound infections.

== Epidemiology ==
The incidence is 32–43 cases per 100,000 people per year. There is an association between Meralgia Paresthetica (MP) and age, body mass index (BMI), and diabetes. In 68% of cases MP occurs in middle-aged men.

== History ==
Meralgia Paresthetica (MP) was first described in 1885 by Martin Bernhardt and named by Vladimir Karlovich Roth in 1895. Roth noticed the syndrome in cavalrymen who wore their belts too tightly. Consequently, Meralgia Paresthetica is also known as Bernhardt-Roth syndrome.

== Society and culture ==
The disorder has also been nicknamed bikini brief syndrome and skinny pants syndrome, because it can be caused by wearing tight clothing.

== See also ==
- lateral femoral cutaneous nerve
- medical concerns due to low rise jeans
- nerve compression syndrome
- neurectomy
- paresthesia
- dysesthesia
- hyperalgesia
