= Saphenous opening =

Opening in the fascia lata of the thigh

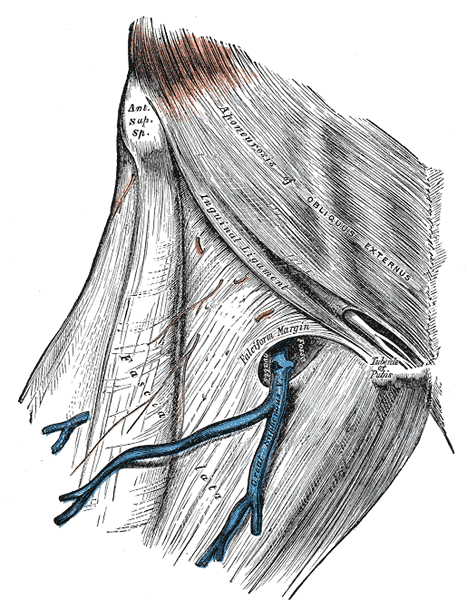
- The fossa ovalis.

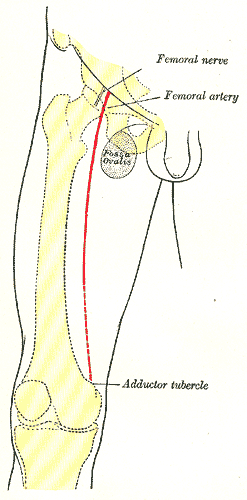
- Front of right thigh, showing surface markings for bones, femoral artery and femoral nerve. (Fossa ovalis visible at upper right.)

Details

Identifiers
- Latin: hiatus saphenus, fossa ovalis femoris
- TA98: A04.7.03.016
- TA2: 2702
- FMA: 58767

In anatomy, the saphenous opening (saphenous hiatus, also fossa ovalis) is an oval opening in the upper mid part of the fascia lata of the thigh. It lies 3–4 cm below and lateral to the pubic tubercle and is about 3 cm long and 1.5 cm wide.

== Structure ==
Just inferolateral to the pubic tubercle the fascia extends downwards forming an arched (falciform) margin of the lateral boundary of the opening. It is covered by a thin perforated part of the superficial fascia called the fascia cribrosa which is pierced by the great saphenous vein, the 3 superficial branches of the femoral artery (except superficial circumflex iliac artery, which pierces fascia lata lateral to the saphenous opening), and lymphatics.

It transmits the great saphenous vein and other smaller vessels including the superficial epigastric artery and superficial external pudendal artery, as well as the femoral branch of the genitofemoral nerve.

The fascia cribrosa, which is pierced by the structures passing through the opening, closes the aperture and must be removed to expose it.

== Clinical significance ==
A femoral hernia, a protrusion of intra-abdominal organ (usually small intestine), courses through the femoral ring, femoral canal and saphenous opening sequentially.

== Additional images ==
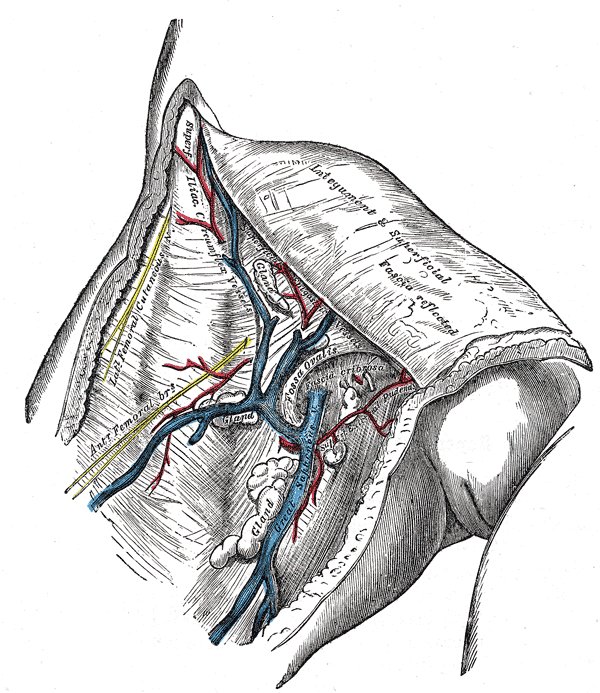
The great saphenous vein and its tributaries at the fossa ovalis.

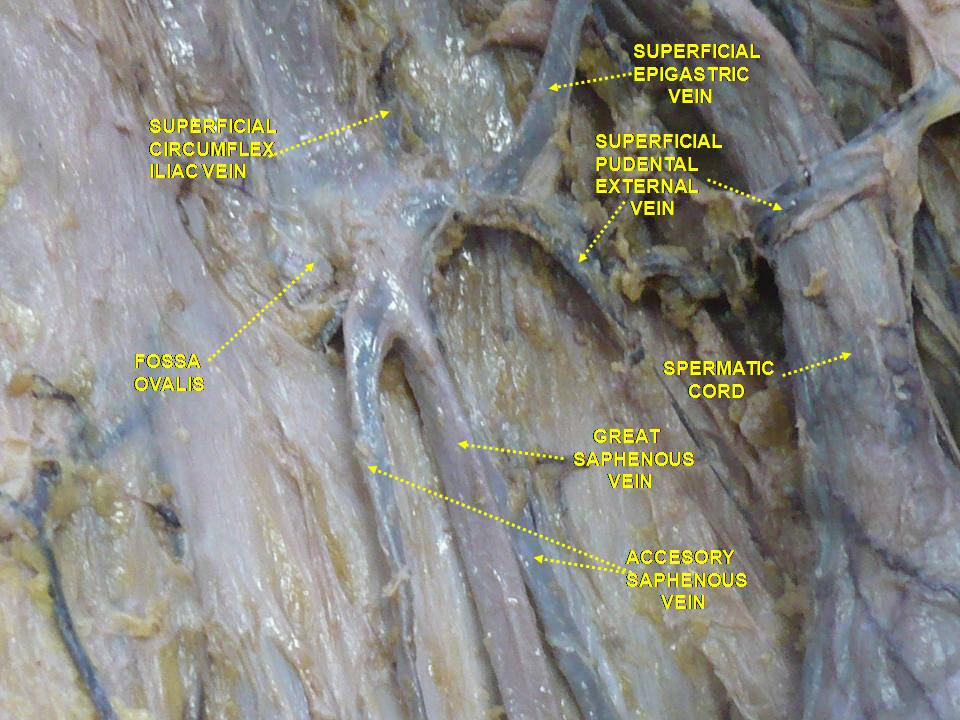
Superficial veins of lower limb. Superficial dissection. Anterior view.
