= Isidor Rosenthal =

German physiologist (1836–1915)

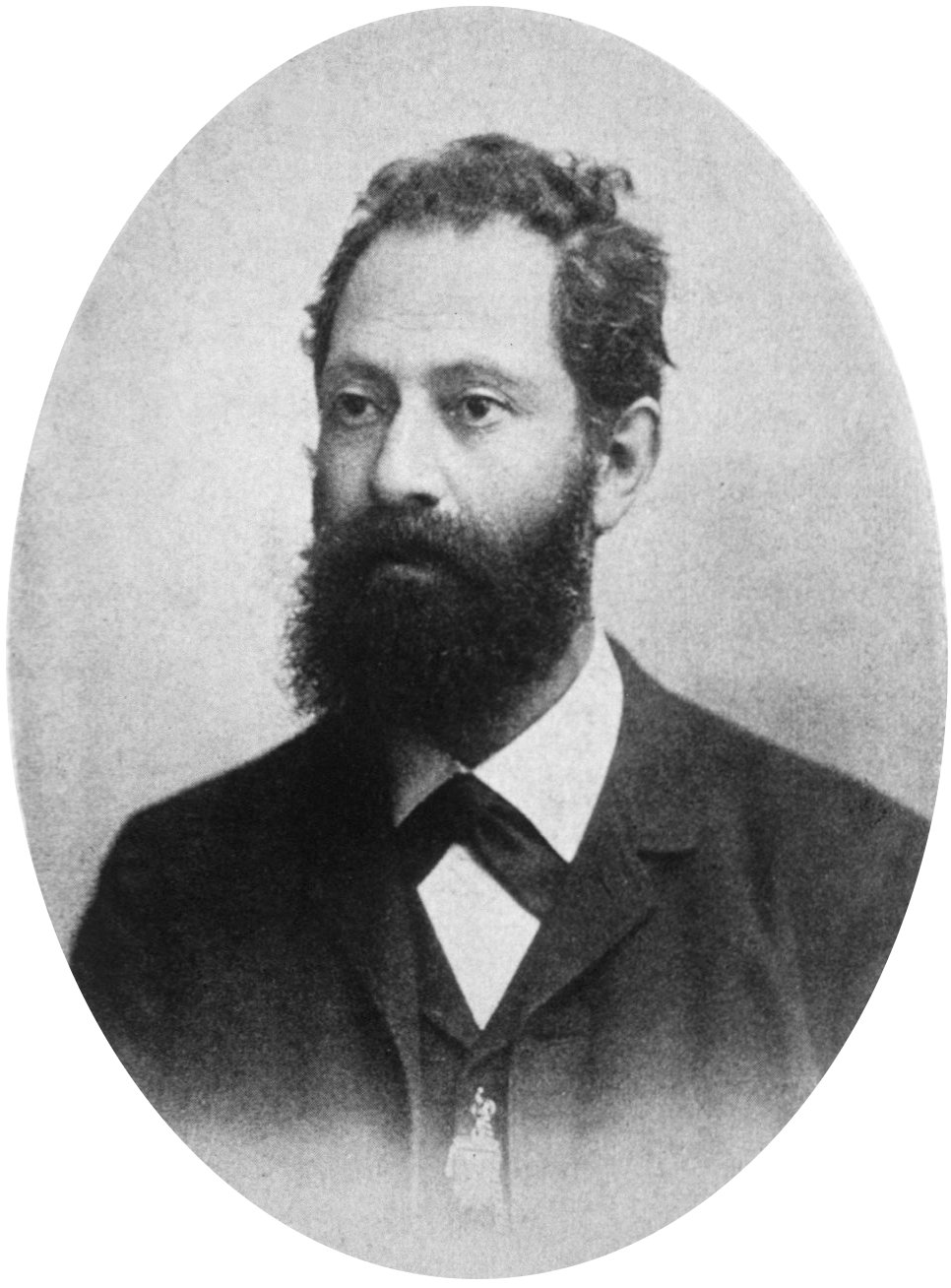
Isidor Rosenthal (1836-1915)

Julius Isidor Rosenthal (16 July 1836 – 2 January 1915) was a German physiologist who was a native of Labischin.

In 1859 he received his doctorate from the University of Berlin, where he was a student of Emil du Bois-Reymond (1818–1896). Afterwards he remained in Berlin as an assistant at the institute of physiology, where in 1867 he became an assistant professor. In 1872 he was appointed professor of physiology at the University of Erlangen.

Rosenthal made contributions in the physiological research of respiration, and in investigations of heat regulation in warm-blooded animals.

He was the author of several articles in Ludimar Hermann's Lehrbuch der Physiologie, and in 1881 became editor of the scientific journal Biologisches Zentralblatt. His book Allgemeine Physiologie der Muskeln und Nerven (General Physiology of Muscles and Nerves) was later translated into English.

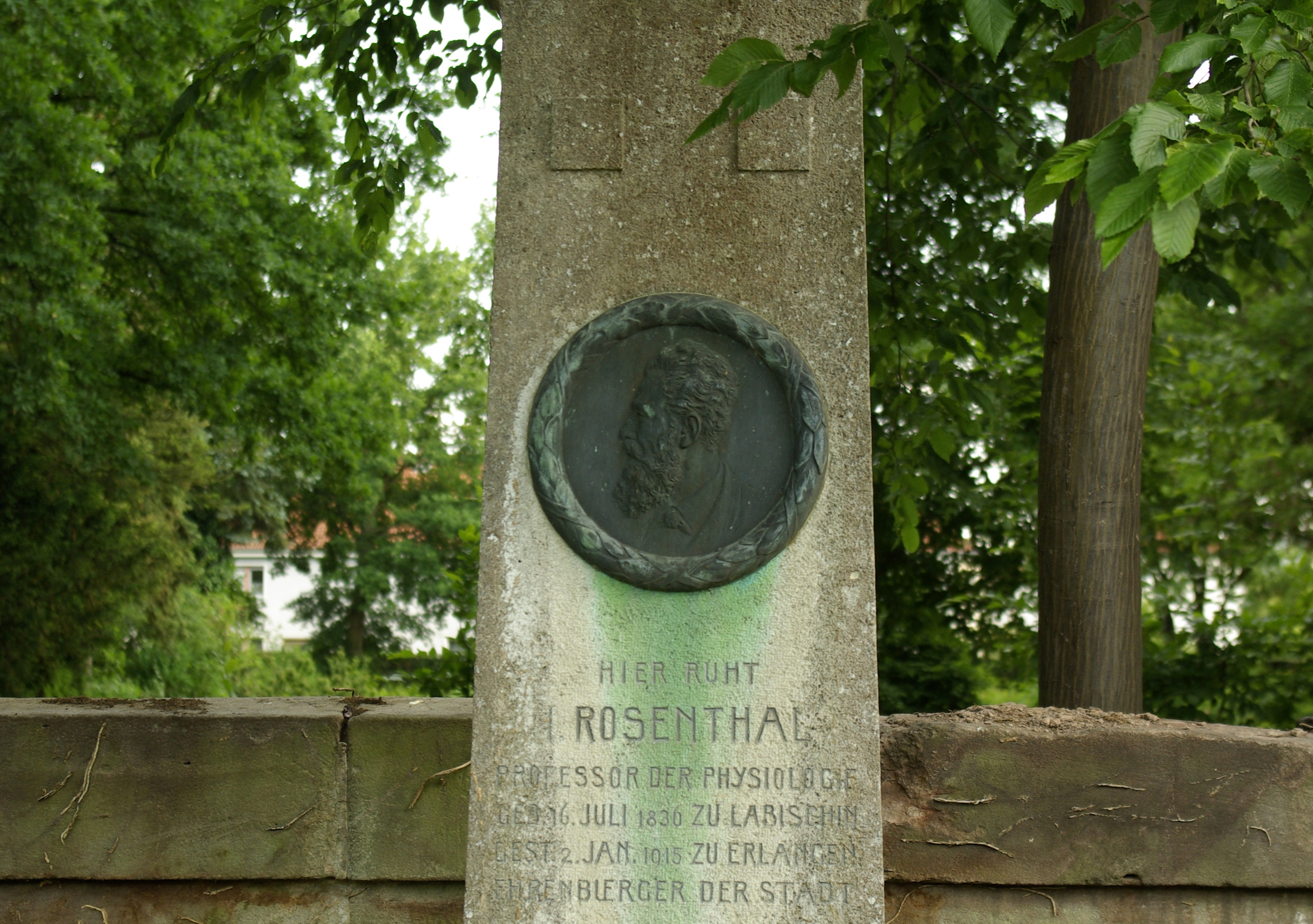
Gravesite of Rosenthal at the Zentralfriedhof in Erlangen

== Selected publications ==
- Die Athembewegungen und Ihre Beziehungen zum Nervus Vagus, (Breathing motions and their relationship with the vagus nerve); Berlin, 1862
- Zur Kenntniss der Wärmeregulirung bei den Warmblütigen Thieren, (Regarding regulatory heat in warm-blooded animals) Erlangen, 1872
- Elektricitätslehre für Mediziner und Elektrotherapie, (Lessons on electricity for physicians and electrotherapy); ib. 1862 (third edition with Martin Bernhardt (1844-1915), 1882
- Allgemeine Physiologie der Muskeln und Nerven (General physiology of muscles and nerves), Leipsic, 1878 (second edition 1898)
- Bier und Branntwein in Ihren Beziehungen zur Volksgesundheitspflege, (Beer and spirits in their importance to public health), Berlin, 1881
- Vorlesungen über Oeffentliche und Private Gesundheitspflege (Lectures on public and private health care); Erlangen, 1887.
