= Brachial amyotrophic diplegia =

Motor neuron disease

Brachial amyotrophic diplegia, also called Vulpian-Bernhardt Syndrome (VBS), flail arm syndrome, or man-in-barrel syndrome, is a rare motor neuron disease, often considered to be a phenotype or regional variant of amyotrophic lateral sclerosis. In the first twelve to eighteen months, only a progressive weakness of one or both arms is observed. Within the spectrum of ALS, this subtype has a relatively longer survival time. Because of its distinct symptoms, it was suggested that VBS is a separate entity, different from ALS.

== Symptoms and signs ==
A study of 1,188 ALS cases in London between 1993 and 2007, and 432 in Melbourne, classified cases as flail arm syndrome when in the first 12 months only a weakness of upper limbs was reported. Based on this criterium, 135 cases or 11% were classified as flail arm syndrome. At later stages, weakening of lower limbs and other ALS symptoms were observed. 16 per cent of these flail arm syndrome cases survived more than ten years, the highest of all variants of ALS in the study.

== Pathophysiology ==
While the cause is usually unknown, it can arise as a paraneoplastic syndrome. There have been case reports linking the condition to SOD1 mutations.

== History ==
The disease was described first in 1886 by the French neurologist Alfred Vulpian and the German neuropathologist Martin Bernhardt as a progressive weakness of the upper limbs but bulbar muscles unaffected. It is a rare and atypical disease that can only be diagnosed after a significant time has elapsed. A 2015 study found significant differences between ALS and VBS, most importantly the absence of signs of upper motor neuron compromise in patients with VBS. The study suggested that VBS is a different entity from ALS.

== Cases ==
One of the few people with brachial amyotrophic diplegia who has spoken in public about the disease is Sonia Bustamante Dominguez, a Mexican woman who showed the first symptoms in 2012 and was diagnosed in 2016. In 2024 she described her body as a jail.
