= Psoas minor muscle =

Long, slender skeletal muscle located anterior to the psoas major muscle

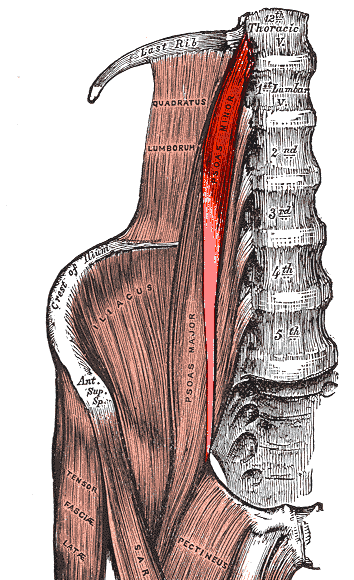
- Muscles of the iliac and anterior femoral regions (psoas minor visible near top right)

Details
- Origin: Lateral surface bodies of T12 and L1 vertebrae and intervening intervertebral disc
- Insertion: Pectineal line and iliopubic eminence
- Nerve: Anterior ramus of nerve L1
- Actions: Weak trunk flexor
- Antagonist: Erector spinae

Identifiers
- Latin: musculus psoas minor
- TA98: A04.7.02.005
- TA2: 2596
- FMA: 22350

The psoas minor muscle (/ˈsoʊ.əs/ or /ˈsoʊ.æs/; from Ancient Greek: ψόᾱ, romanized: psóā, lit. 'muscles of the loins') is a long, slender skeletal muscle. When present, it is located anterior to the psoas major muscle.

== Structure ==
The psoas minor muscle originates from the vertical fascicles inserted on the last thoracic and first lumbar vertebrae. From there, it passes down onto the medial border of the psoas major, and is inserted to the innominate line and the iliopectineal eminence. Additionally, it attaches to and stretches the deep surface of the iliac fascia and occasionally its lowermost fibers reach the inguinal ligament. It is posteriolateral to the iliopsoas muscle. Variations occur, however, and the insertion on the iliopubic eminence sometimes radiates into the iliopectineal arch.

The psoas minor muscle receives oxygenated blood from the four lumbar arteries (inferior to the subcostal artery) and the lumbar branch of the iliolumbar artery.

=== Innervation ===
The psoas minor muscle is innervated by direct branches of the lumbar spinal nerves.

=== Variation ===
The psoas minor muscle is considered inconstant and is often absent, only being present in about 40% of human specimens studied. It has an average length of about 24 cm, of which about 7.1 cm is muscle tissue and about 17 cm is tendon.

== Function ==
The psoas minor is a weak flexor of the lumbar vertebral column.

== Other animals ==
The psoas minor muscle is present in other mammals, such as horses. In horses, it may be palpated during rectal exams to check for causes of back pain.

== Additional images ==
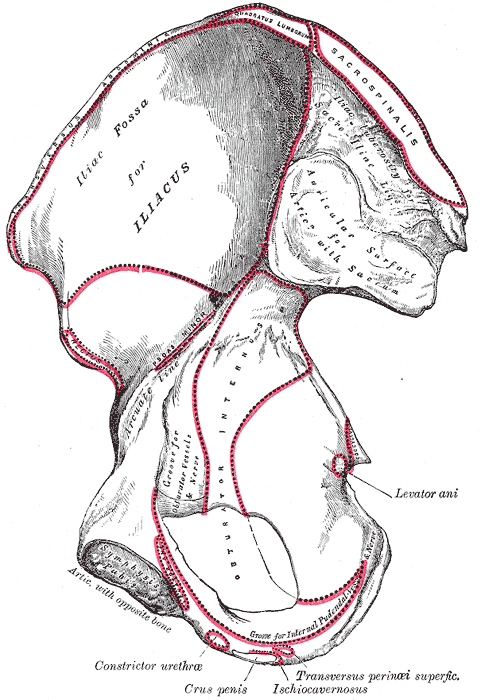
Right hip bone, internal surface

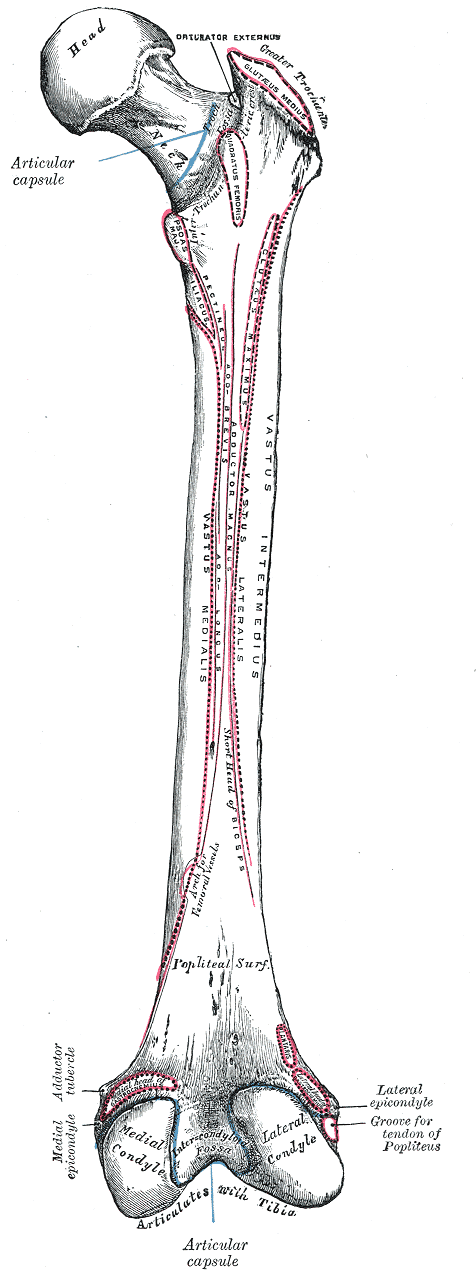
Right femur, posterior surface

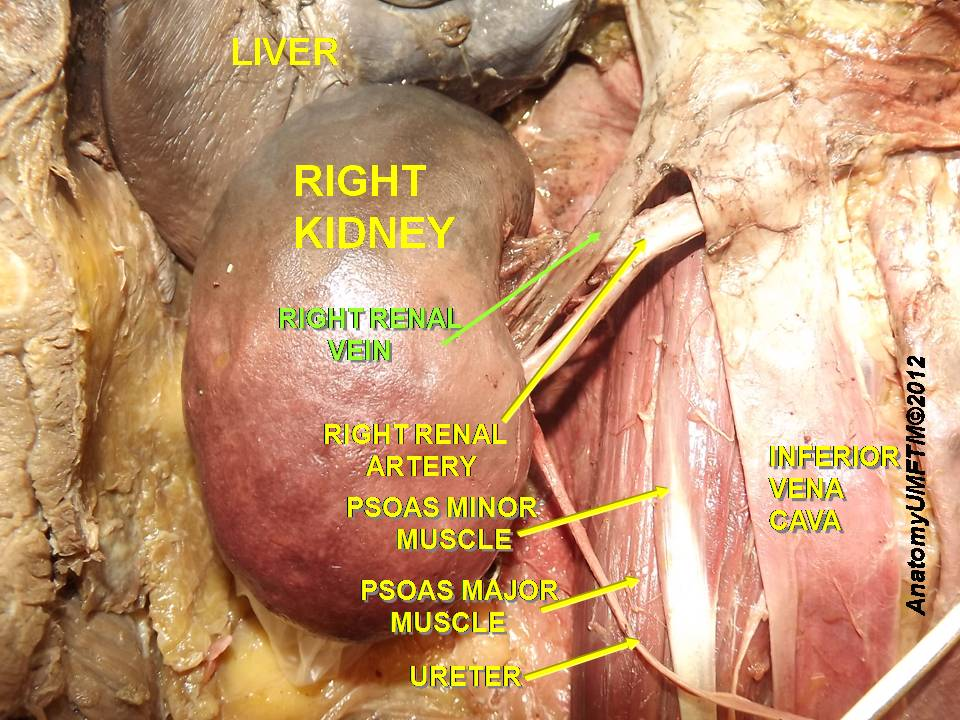
Psoas minor muscle

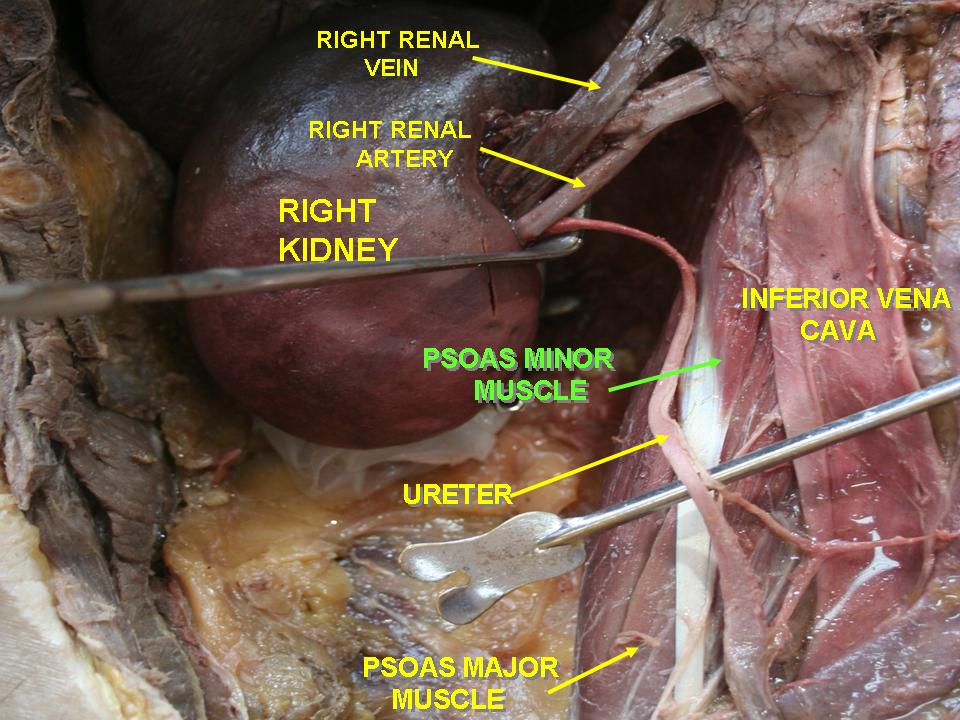
Psoas minor muscle

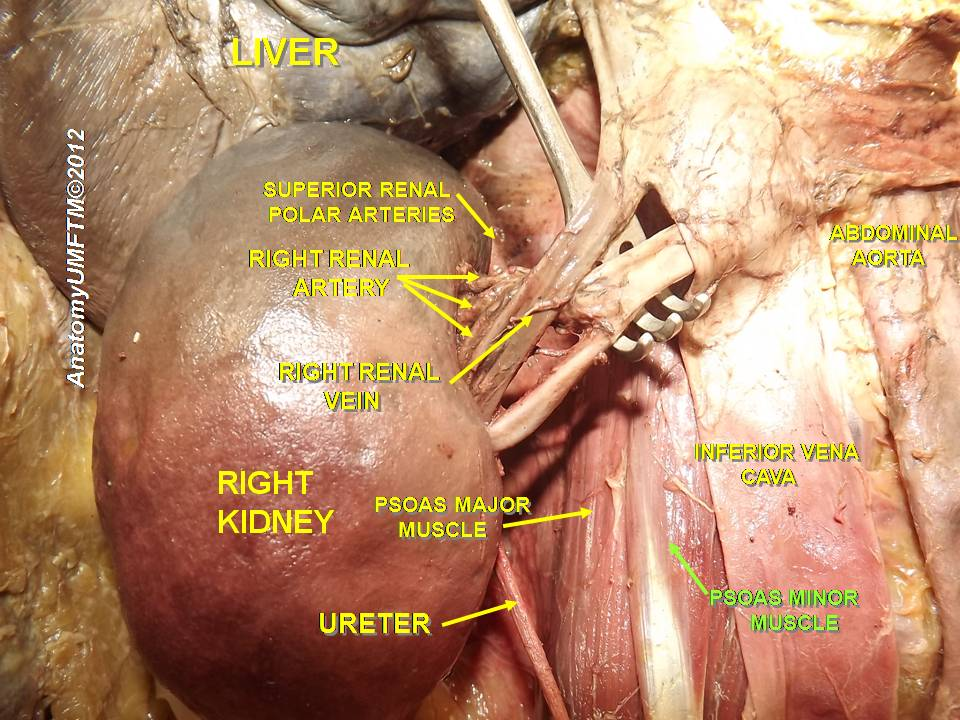
Psoas minor muscle
