= Viktor von Hacker =

Austrian surgeon

Viktor von Hacker (October 21, 1852 – May 20, 1933) was an Austrian surgeon born in Vienna.

In 1878 he received his medical doctorate at the University of Vienna, and after graduation remained in Vienna as an assistant to Theodor Billroth (1829–1894). Later he was a professor of surgery at the Universities of Innsbruck (1894–1903) and Graz (1904–1924).

Hacker is remembered for his work involving esophagoscopy, esophageal surgery and gastrointestinal surgery. With German-American surgeon Carl Beck (1856–1911), he is credited with developing a surgical technique for balanic hypospadias.

In 1885, Hacker assisted Billroth when the latter performed the first resection of the pylorus followed by posterior gastrojejunostomy. Afterwards, Hacker documented a detailed account of the operation. With surgeon Georg Lotheissen (1868–1941), he published two treatises concerning the esophagus, Angeborene Missbildungen, Verletzungen und Erkrankungen der Speiseröhre (Congenital abnormalities, injuries and diseases of the esophagus) and Chirurgie der Speiseröhre (Surgery of the esophagus).
