= De Garengeot's hernia =

Medical condition

De Garengeot's hernia is a rare subtype of an incarcerated femoral hernia. This eponym may be used to describe the incarceration of the vermiform appendix within a femoral hernia. This mechanism is contrasted with the Amyand hernia, in which the appendix protrudes through an inguinal hernia.

Akopian and Alexander, named this hernia after the 18th century Parisian surgeon Rene Jacques Croissant de Garengeot. He is quoted in the surgical literature as the first to describe this hernia in 1731. Although the surgeon's full last name is Croissant de Garengeot, for linguistic convenience it has been suggested to abbreviate this eponym to "de Garengeot". De Garengeot's first-described patient developed tenderness and a bulge in her right upper thigh after lifting 24 lb of bread. The bulge was unable to be reduced, after which surgery was conducted and a femoral hernia was discovered. The hernia was reduced back into the peritoneal cavity and the patient made an adequate recovery in 6 weeks.

Similar as with the situation of an Amyand's hernia, the true nature of the incarcerated tissue is rarely diagnosed preoperatively. Patients present clinically similar to other incarcerated femoral herniae. Treatment consists of an appendectomy and hernia repair. Laparoscopic options are described.

== Epidemiology ==
De Garengeot hernia are most commonly seen in females and patients between 60 and 90 years of age.

== Diagnosis ==
Diagnosis of De Garengeot hernia is most commonly made at the time of surgery, but some are diagnosed pre-operatively by CT scan, ultrasound, or MRI. If De Garengeot hernia is suspected based on general clinical signs of abdominal tenderness or bulging, CT scan is recommended.

== Treatment ==
A individualized treatment approach is required based on the severity of the hernia and the surgeon's skill level and experience. Since the condition is rare, there have not been documented randomized control trials. De Garengeot hernias can be treated with closed reduction, laparoscopic repair, appendectomy, and open repair. Mesh placement can be considered based on severity of the hernia. The most common route of surgical management was through a groin incision, and appendectomy was performed in 98.5% of patients.

== Prevention ==
Prevention of De Garengeot hernia involves measures that prevent hernias generally, such as maintaining a healthy weight, avoiding tight-fitting clothes, avoiding heavy straining when using the restroom, and avoiding improper heavy lifting.
