= Saphena varix =

Medical condition

A saphena varix, or saphenous varix, is a dilation of the great saphenous vein at its junction with the femoral vein in the groin. It is a common surgical problem, and patients may present with groin swelling.

== Clinical features ==
It displays a cough impulse and may be mistaken for a femoral hernia. However it has a bluish tinge and disappears on lying down. On auscultation a venous hum may be heard. It is frequently associated with varicose veins. Saphena varix can be easily diagnosed by ultrasound. Saphena varix shows flow on duplex ultrasonography.
