= Femoral canal =

Anatomy of the leg

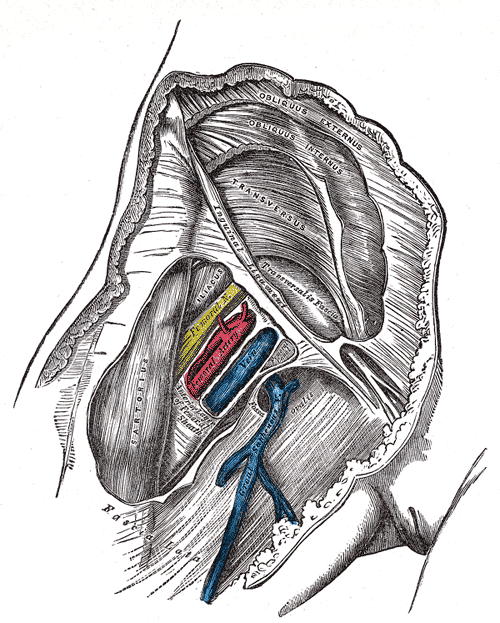
- Femoral sheath laid open to show its three compartments. (The femoral canal is both visible and labeled [difficult to see label] medial to the femoral vein.)

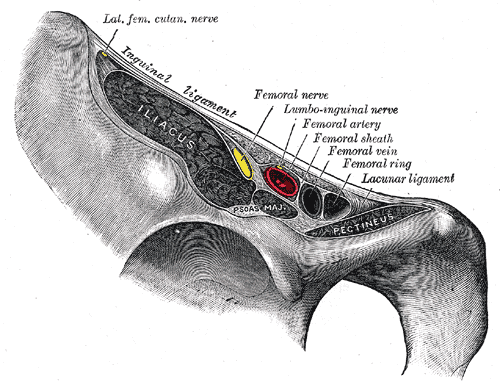
- Structures passing behind the inguinal ligament. The entrance to the femoral canal, the femoral ring, is labeled at right.

Details
- Artery: Femoral artery
- Vein: Femoral vein, external iliac vein
- Nerve: Femoral nerve, genitofemoral nerve

Identifiers
- Latin: canalis femoralis
- TA98: A04.7.03.012
- TA2: 2698
- FMA: 22405

The femoral canal is the medial (and smallest) compartment of the three compartments of the femoral sheath. It is conical in shape. The femoral canal contains lymphatic vessels, and adipose and loose connective tissue, as well as - sometimes - a deep inguinal lymph node. The function of the femoral canal is to accommodate the distension of the femoral vein when venous return from the leg is increased or temporarily restricted (e.g. during a Valsalva maneuver).

The proximal, abdominal end of the femoral canal forms the femoral ring.

The femoral canal should not be confused with the nearby adductor canal.

== Anatomy ==
The femoral canal is bordered:

- anterosuperiorly by the inguinal ligament
- posteriorly by the pectineal ligament lying anterior to the superior pubic ramus
- Medially by the lacunar ligament
- Laterally by the femoral vein

Video of relevant anatomy

== Physiological significance ==
The position of the femoral canal medially to the femoral vein is of physiologic importance. The space of the canal allows for the expansion of the femoral vein when venous return from the lower limbs is increased or when increased intra-abdominal pressure (Valsalva maneuver) causes a temporary stasis in the venous flow.

== Clinical significance ==
The entrance to the femoral canal is the femoral ring, through which bowel can sometimes enter, causing a femoral hernia. Though femoral hernias are rare, their passage through the inflexible femoral ring puts them at particular risk of strangulation, giving them surgical priority.

== See also ==
- Femoral ring
