= Femoral vessel =

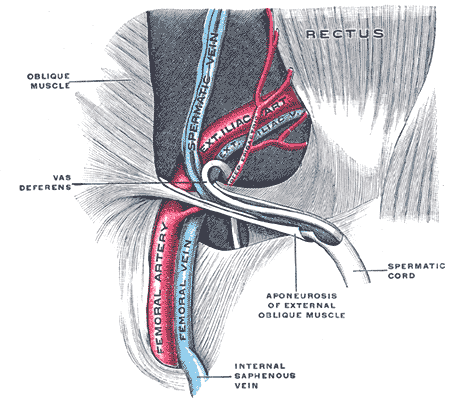
Gray1146: Femoral vessels as they pass under the inguinal ligament

The femoral vessels are those blood vessels passing through the femoral ring into the femoral canal thereby passing down the length of the thigh until behind the knee. These large vessel are the:

- Femoral artery (also known in this location as the common femoral artery) and
- Femoral vein

Lymphatic vessels found in the thigh aren’t usually included in this collective noun.

As the blood vessels pass along the thigh, they branch, with their main branches remaining closely associated, where they are still referred to collectively as femoral vessels.

The adjective femoral, in this case, relates to the thigh, which contains the femur.

The relative position of these two large vessels is very important in medicine and surgery, because several medical interventions involve puncturing one or the other of them. Reliably distinguishing between them is therefore important. The location of the vessel is also used as an anatomical landmark for the femoral nerve.
