= Lacunar ligament =

Ligament of the abdomen

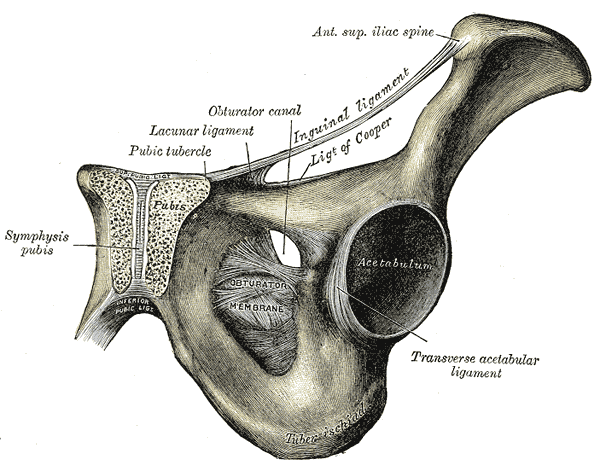
- The inguinal and lacunar ligaments. (Lacunar ligament labeled at center top.)

Details
- From: Inguinal ligament, pubic tubercle
- To: Pectineal line

Identifiers
- Latin: ligamentum lacunare (Gimbernati)
- TA98: A04.5.01.010
- TA2: 2366
- FMA: 20184

The lacunar ligament, also named Gimbernat's ligament, is a ligament in the inguinal region. It connects the inguinal ligament to the pectineal ligament, near the point where they both insert on the pubic tubercle.

== Structure ==
The lacunar ligament is the part of the aponeurosis of the external oblique muscle that is reflected backward and laterally and is attached to the pectineal line of the pubis.

It is about 1.25 cm. long, larger in the male than in the female, almost horizontal in direction in the erect posture, and of a triangular form with the base directed laterally.

Its base is concave, thin, and sharp, and forms the medial boundary of the femoral ring. Its apex corresponds to the pubic tubercle.

Its posterior margin is attached to the pectineal line, and is continuous with the pectineal ligament. Its anterior margin is attached to the inguinal ligament.

Its surfaces are directed upward and downward.

== Clinical significance ==
The lacunar ligament is the only boundary of the femoral canal that can be cut during surgery to release a femoral hernia. Care must be taken when doing so as up to 25% of people have an aberrant obturator artery (corona mortis) which can cause significant bleeding.

== History ==
The lacunar ligament is sometimes called Gimbernat's ligament after Antoni de Gimbernat.

== Additional images ==
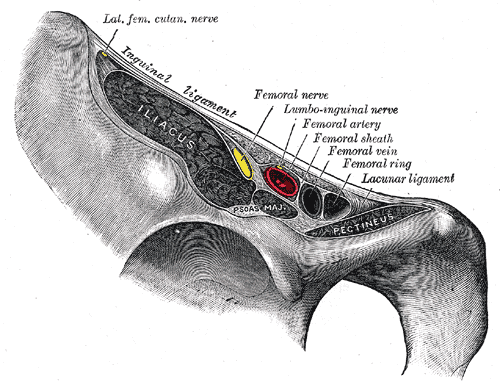
Structures passing behind the inguinal ligament.

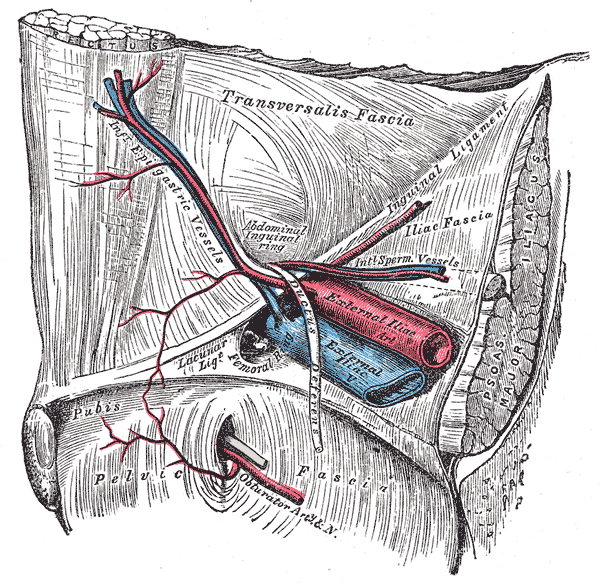
The relations of the femoral and abdominal inguinal rings, seen from within the abdomen. Right side.

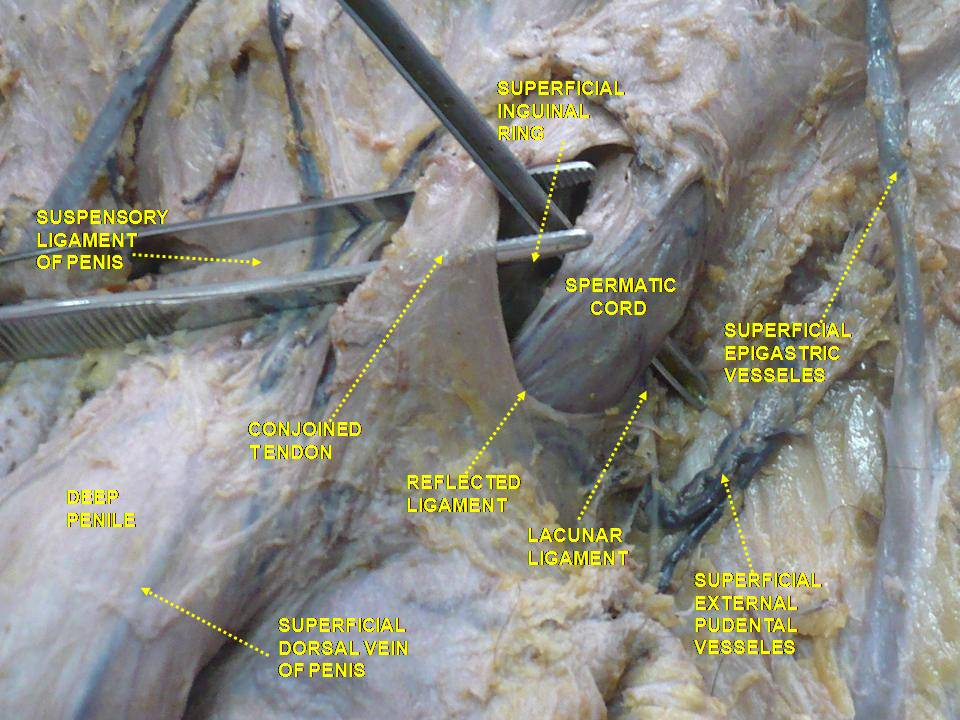
Anterior abdominal wall. Intermediate dissection. Anterior view

== See also ==
- Inguinal ligament
- Pectineal ligament
