= Inguinal lymph nodes =

Lymph nodes in the human groin

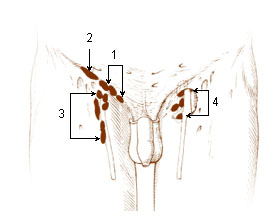
- 1. Superomedial superficial inguinal 2. Superolateral superficial inguinal 3. Inferior superficial inguinal 4. Deep inguinal lymph nodes

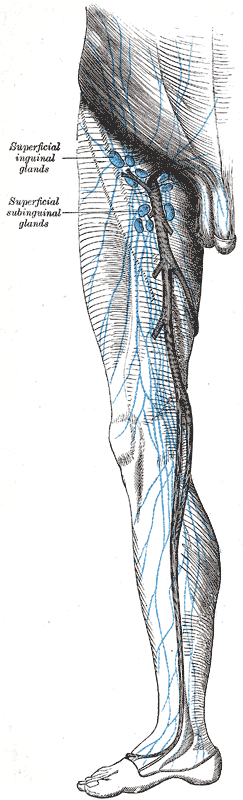
- The lymph glands and lymphatic vessels of the lower extremity in males.

Details
- System: Lymphatic system
- Drains from: Most of perineal region
- Drains to: Abdominal region of lymph nodes

Identifiers
- Latin: nodi lymphoidei inguinales superficiales
- TA98: A13.3.05.002
- FMA: 44226

Inguinal lymph nodes are lymph nodes in the groin. They are situated in the femoral triangle of the inguinal region. They are subdivided into two groups: the superficial inguinal lymph nodes and deep inguinal lymph nodes.

== Superficial inguinal lymph nodes ==
The superficial inguinal lymph nodes are the inguinal lymph nodes that form a chain immediately inferior to the inguinal ligament. They lie deep to the fascia of Camper that overlies the femoral vessels at the medial aspect of the thigh. They are bounded superiorly by the inguinal ligament in the femoral triangle, laterally by the border of the sartorius muscle, and medially by the adductor longus muscle.

There are approximately 10 superficial lymph nodes. They normally measure up to 2 cm in diameter.

They are divided into three groups:

- inferior – inferior of the saphenous opening of the leg, receive drainage from lower legs
- superolateral – on the side of the saphenous opening, receive drainage from the side buttocks and the lower abdominal wall.
- superomedial – located at the middle of the saphenous opening, take drainage from the perineum and genitals.

=== Afferents ===
They may receive lymphatic afferents from the following as applicable:

- integument of the penis
- scrotum
- perineum
- buttock
- abdominal wall below the level of the umbilicus
- back below the level of the iliac crest
- vulva
- anus (below the pectinate line)
- the thigh and the medial side of the leg (the lateral leg drains to the popliteal lymph nodes first).

=== Efferents ===
They drain to the deep inguinal lymph nodes.

== Deep inguinal lymph nodes ==
The deep inguinal lymph nodes are 3-5 in number. They lie medial to the femoral vein deep to the cribriform fascia.

=== Size ===
The mean size of an inguinal lymph node, as measured over the short-axis, is approximately 5.4 mm (range 2.1-13.6 mm), with two standard deviations above the mean being 8.8 mm. A size of up to 10 mm is generally regarded as a cut-off value for normal vs abnormal inguinal lymph node size.

=== Cloquet's node ===
The superior-most node is situated in the groin, deep to the inguinal ligament, and is termed the Cloquet's node (also Rosenmuller's node). It can instead be considered as the inferior-most of the external iliac lymph nodes. Cloquet's node is also considered as a potential sentinel lymph node.

This node is named for French surgeon Jules Germain Cloquet, or for German anatomist Johann Christian Rosenmüller.

=== Efferents ===
The deep inguinal lymph nodes drain superiorly to the external iliac lymph nodes, then to the pelvic lymph nodes and on to the paraaortic lymph nodes.

== Clinical significance ==
The presence of swollen inguinal lymph nodes is an important clinical sign because lymphadenopathy (swelling) may indicate an infection, or spread as a metastasis from cancers, such as anal cancer and vulvar cancer. Inguinal lymph nodes may normally be up to 2 cm. The cut-off value for normal sized inguinal nodes is up to 10 mm.

== Additional images ==
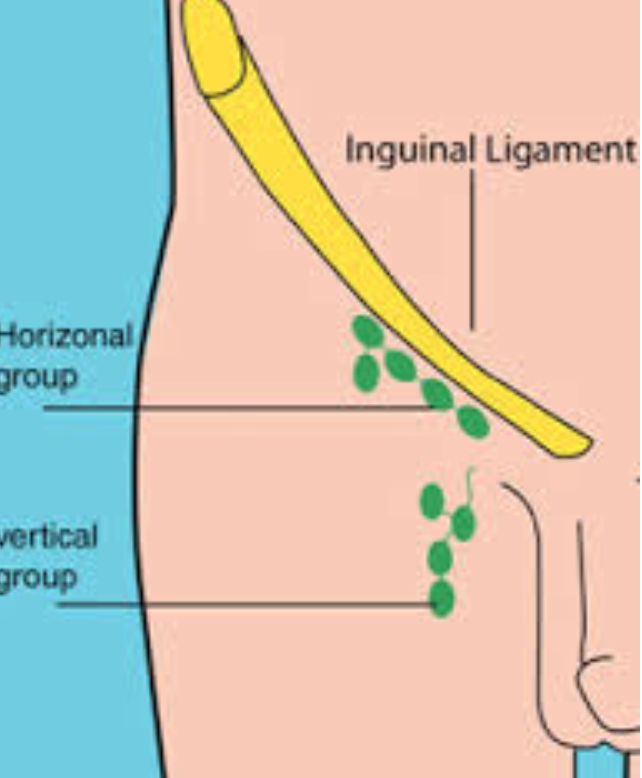
A view of the different inguinal lymph nodes

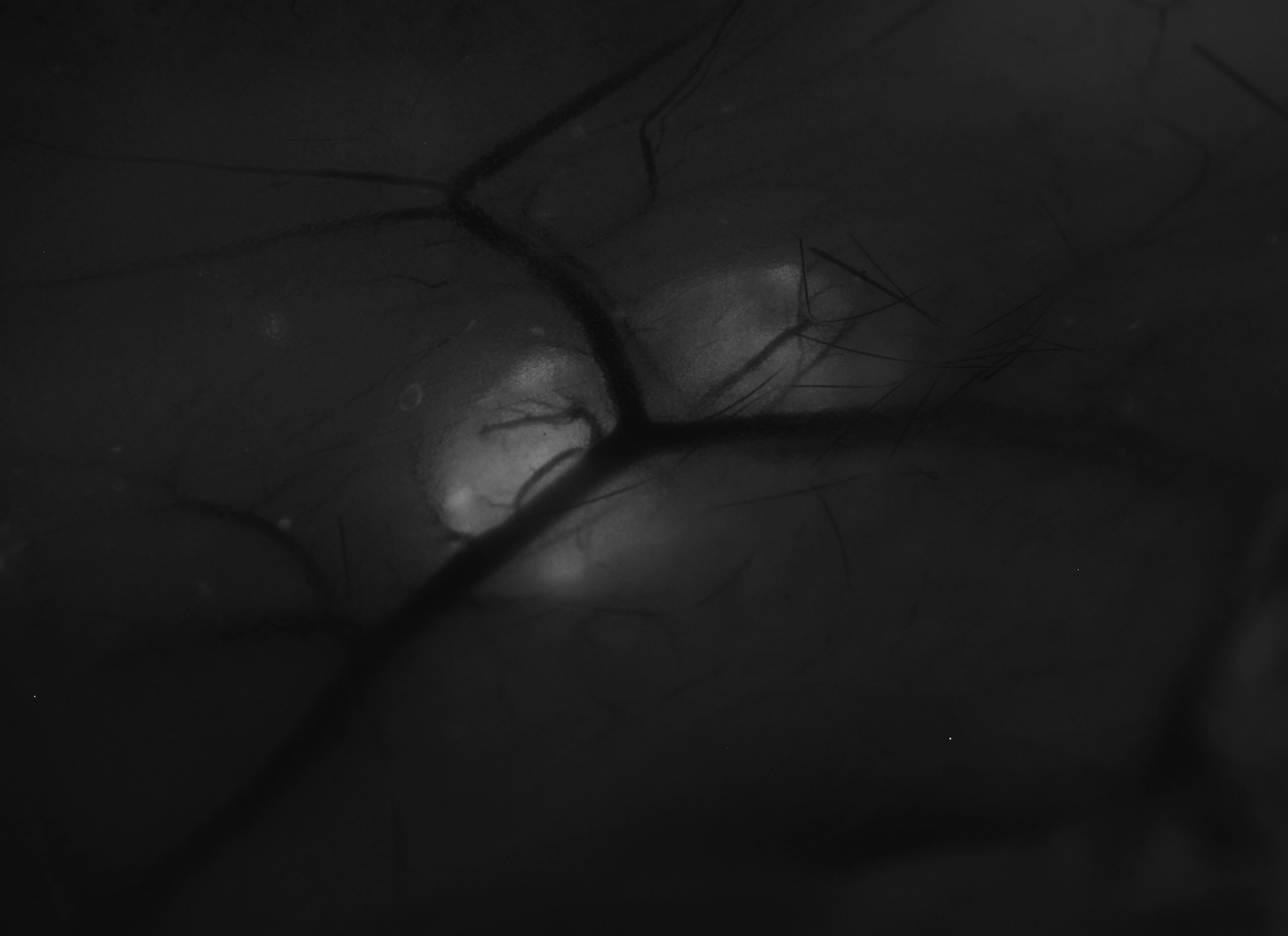
Murine inguinal lymph node beneath the bifurcation of superior epigastric vein. Bright structure visualised by MHC II-GFP construct, is the lymph node

Lymph node regions
