= Muscular lacuna =

Lateral compartment of the thigh inferior to the inguinal ligament

The muscular lacuna (Latin: lacuna musculorum) is the lateral compartment of the thigh beneath the inguinal ligament. It is separated from the medial vascular lacuna by the iliopectineal arch. It is occupied/traversed by the iliopsoas muscle, and femoral nerve. The lateral cutaneous nerve of the thigh may pass through the muscular lacuna, or it may pierce the inguinal ligament itself.
