= Iliopectineal arch =

Thickened band

Iliopectineal fascia

Details

Identifiers
- Latin: arcus iliopectineus
- TA98: A04.5.02.010
- TA2: 2695
- FMA: 57861

The iliopectineal arch is a thickened band of fused iliac fascia and psoas fascia passing from the posterior aspect of the inguinal ligament anteriorly across the front of the femoral nerve to attach to the iliopubic eminence of the hip bone posteriorly. The iliopectineal arch thus forms a septum which subdivides the space deep to the inguinal ligament into a lateral muscular lacuna and a medial vascular lacuna. When a psoas minor muscle is present, its tendon of insertion blends with the iliopectineal arch

It is sometimes transected in treatment of femoral nerve entrapment.

== Additional images ==
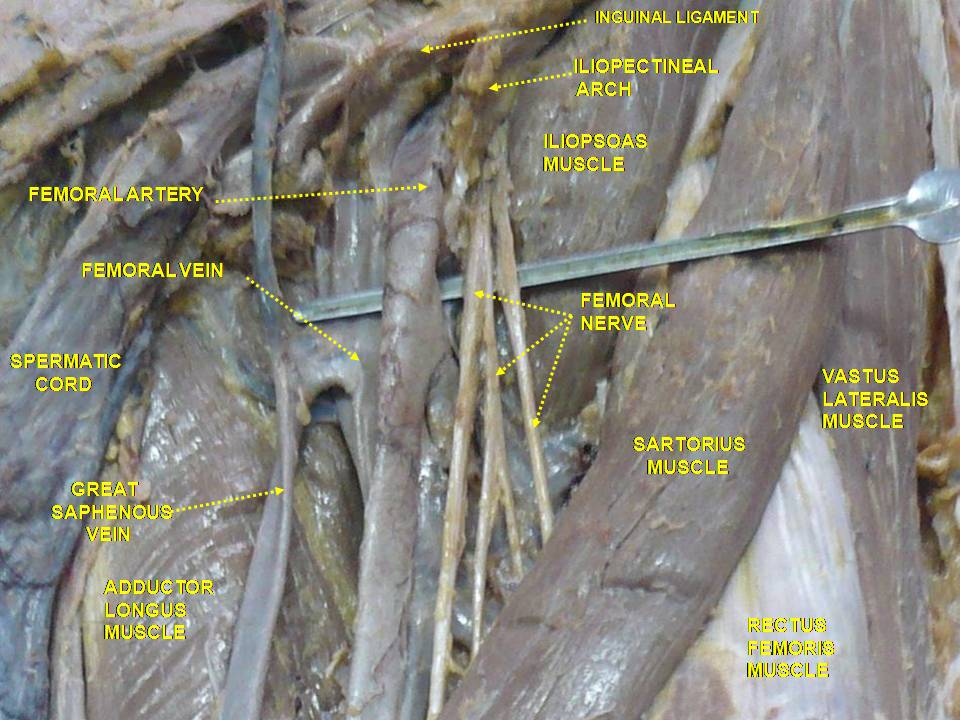
Iliopectal arch. Deep dissection. Anterior view.
