= Femoral ring =

Base of the femoral canal

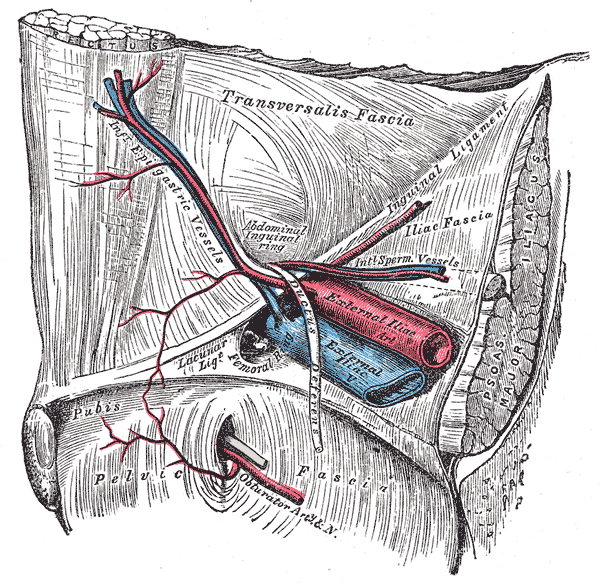
- The relations of the femoral and abdominal inguinal ring, seen from within the abdomen. Left side (femoral ring visible at center)

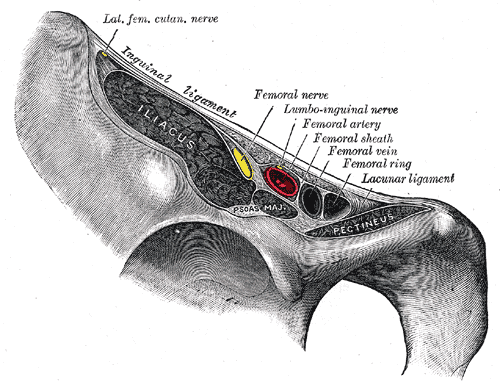
- Structures passing behind the inguinal ligament (femoral ring labeled at top, second from the right)

Details

Identifiers
- Latin: anulus femoralis
- TA98: A04.7.03.014
- TA2: 2699
- FMA: 77263

The femoral ring is the opening at the proximal, abdominal end of the femoral canal, and represents the (superiorly directed/oriented) base of the conically-shaped femoral canal. The femoral ring is oval-shaped, with its long diameter being directed transversely and measuring about 1.25 cm. The opening of the femoral ring is filled in by extraperitoneal fat, forming the femoral septum.

Part of the intestine can sometimes pass through the femoral ring into the femoral canal causing a femoral hernia.

== Boundaries ==
The femoral ring is bounded as follows:

- anteriorly by the inguinal ligament.
- posteriorly by the pectineal ligament.
- medially by the crescentic base of the lacunar ligament.
- laterally by the fibrous septum on the medial side of the femoral vein.

== Additional images ==
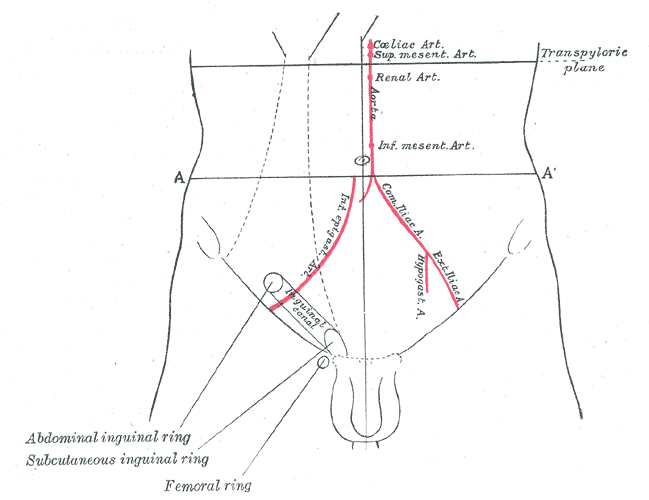
Front of abdomen, showing surface markings for arteries and inguinal canal.

== See also ==
- Femoral canal
- Femoral hernia
- Inguinal canal
