= Pectineal ligament =

Ligament of the abdomen

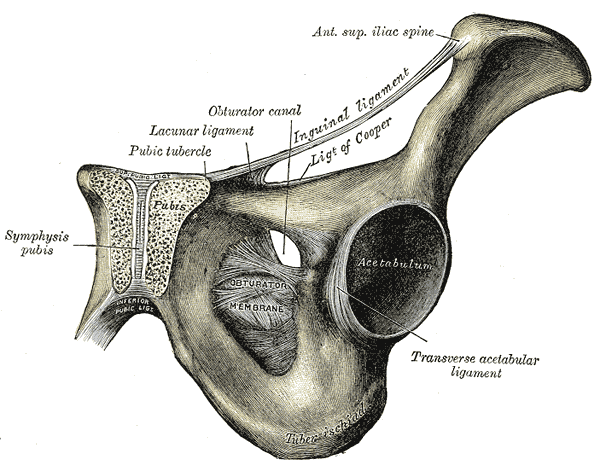
- The inguinal and lacunar ligaments.

Details
- From: Lacunar ligament
- To: Pectineal line

Identifiers
- Latin: ligamentum pectineum
- TA98: A04.5.01.011
- TA2: 2367
- FMA: 20188

The pectineal ligament, sometimes known as the inguinal ligament of Cooper, is an extension of the lacunar ligament. It runs on the pectineal line of the pubic bone. The pectineal ligament is the posterior border of the femoral ring.

== Structure ==
The pectineal ligament connects to the lacunar ligament, and therefore to the inguinal ligament. It connects to the pectineus muscle on its ventral and superior aspects. It connects to the rectus abdominis muscle, and the abdominal internal oblique muscle, of the anterior abdominal wall.

The pectineal ligament is usually around 6 cm long in adults. It is close to the major vasculature of the pelvis, including external iliac vein.

== Clinical significance ==
The pectineal ligament is strong, and holds suture well. This facilitates reconstruction of the floor of the inguinal canal. It is a useful landmark for pelvic surgery. A variant of non-prosthetic inguinal hernia repair, first used by Georg Lotheissen in Austria, now bears his name.

== History ==
The pectineal ligament was characterized by Astley Cooper in 1804.

== See also ==
- Inguinal ligament
- Lacunar ligament
- Inguinal canal
- Cooper's ligaments
