= Lateral cutaneous nerve of thigh =

Nerve of the thigh

- Plan of lumbar plexus. (Lateral femoral cutaneous visible at left.)

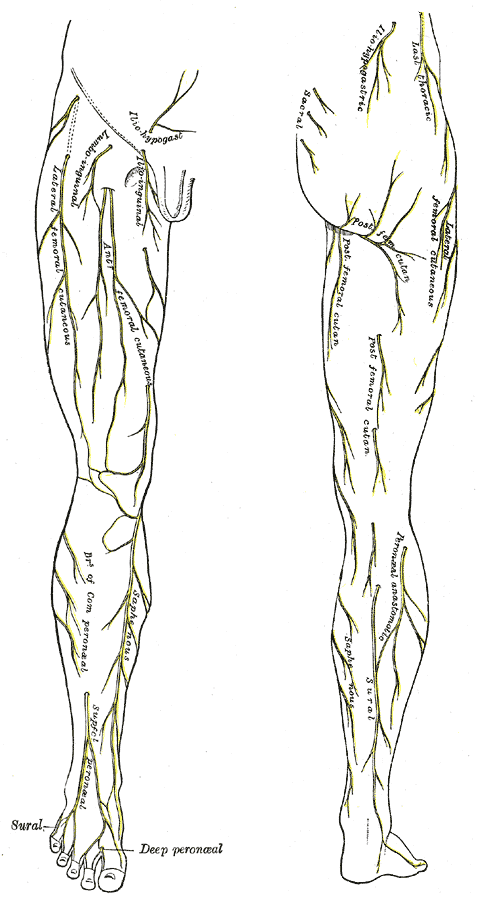
- Cutaneous nerves of the right lower extremity. Front and posterior views.

Details
- From: Lumbar plexus (L2–L3)
- Innervates: Skin on the lateral part of the thigh

Identifiers
- Latin: nervus cutaneus femoris lateralis
- TA98: A14.2.07.011
- TA2: 6521
- FMA: 16485

The lateral cutaneous nerve of the thigh (also called the lateral femoral cutaneous nerve) is a cutaneous nerve of the thigh. It originates from the dorsal divisions of the second and third lumbar nerves from the lumbar plexus. It passes under the inguinal ligament to reach the thigh. It supplies sensation to the skin on the lateral part of the thigh by an anterior branch and a posterior branch.

The lateral cutaneous nerve of the thigh can be investigated using ultrasound. Local anaesthetic can be injected around the nerve for skin grafts and surgery around the outer thigh. Nerve compression (usually around the inguinal ligament) can cause meralgia paraesthetica.

== Structure ==
The nerve is usually 1–2 mm thick.

=== Origin ===
The lateral cutaneous nerve of the thigh is a nerve of the lumbar plexus. It arises from the anterior rami of the second and third lumbar nerves (L2–L3).

=== Course and relations ===
It passes through psoas major muscle, and emerges from its lateral border. It crosses the iliacus muscle obliquely, toward the anterior superior iliac spine (ASIS). It is crossed by the deep circumflex iliac artery and the deep circumflex iliac vein. It enters the thigh by passing beneath (the lateral part of) the inguinal ligament in the muscular lacuna, or through (the lateral part of) the inguinal ligament itself. It then passes over the sartorius muscle, travelling from medial to lateral.

=== Branches ===
The lateral cutaneous nerve of the thigh usually divides into an anterior (or anterolateral) branch and a posterior branch.

==== Anterior branch ====
The anterior branch becomes superficial about 10 cm below the inguinal ligament. It divides into branches which are distributed to the skin of the anterior and lateral parts of the thigh, as far down as the knee. The terminal filaments of this nerve frequently communicate with the anterior cutaneous branches of the femoral nerve, and with the infrapatellar branch of the saphenous nerve, forming with them the peripatellar plexus.

==== Posterior branch ====
The posterior branch pierces the fascia lata. It subdivides into filaments, which pass backward across the lateral and posterior surfaces of the thigh. It supplies the skin around the greater trochanter.

=== Distribution ===
It provides sensory innervation to the lateral aspect of the thigh (as far as the knee), as well as the iliac fascia and perineum of the iliac fascia.

=== Variation ===
The lateral cutaneous nerve of the thigh may have multiple branches. Its position with relation to the ASIS can be very variable. It may partially pass through sartorius muscle rather than over its surface. It may be absent, and the sensory supply replaced by branches of the femoral nerve and the ilioinguinal nerve.

== Function ==
The lateral cutaneous nerve of the thigh is a sensory nerve. It supplies the skin on the lateral (outer) part of the thigh.

== Clinical significance ==
=== Ultrasound ===
The lateral cutaneous nerve of the thigh can be studied using ultrasound. A patient lies on a bed facing upwards (supine). The ultrasound probe is moved along the length of the nerve, often starting from near the ASIS. The nerve is easier to see over the sartorius muscle than in other subcutaneous tissue, as there is greater contrast. It can sometimes be difficult to see due to surrounding soft tissue.

=== Nerve block ===
The lateral cutaneous nerve of the thigh can be blocked with local anaesthetic. Ultrasound is used to guide needle insertion. This is used for procedures in the supplied area of skin, such as surgical incisions over the outer thigh, and skin grafts.

=== Meralgia paraesthetica ===
Entrapment of the lateral cutaneous nerve of the thigh is caused by compression of the nerve near the anterior superior iliac spine and the inguinal ligament. This causes meralgia paraesthetica (Bernhardt-Roth syndrome). This may be diagnosed with ultrasound, which changes the morphology of the nerve. Changes can include general enlargement, and a hypoechoic appearance. In patients who only have meralgia paraesthetica on one side, ultrasound scans are performed on both thighs to compare the appearance of the nerve.

== History ==
The lateral cutaneous nerve of the thigh may also be known as the lateral femoral cutaneous nerve.

== Additional images ==
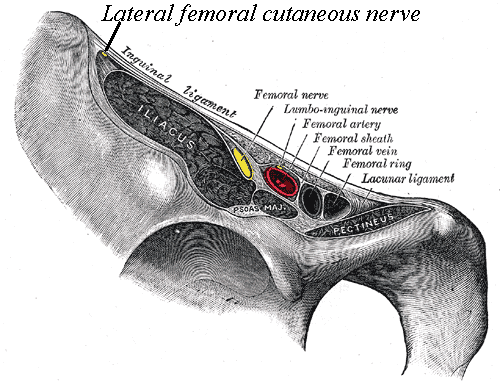
Lateral cutaneous nerve of thigh and other structures passing behind the inguinal ligament

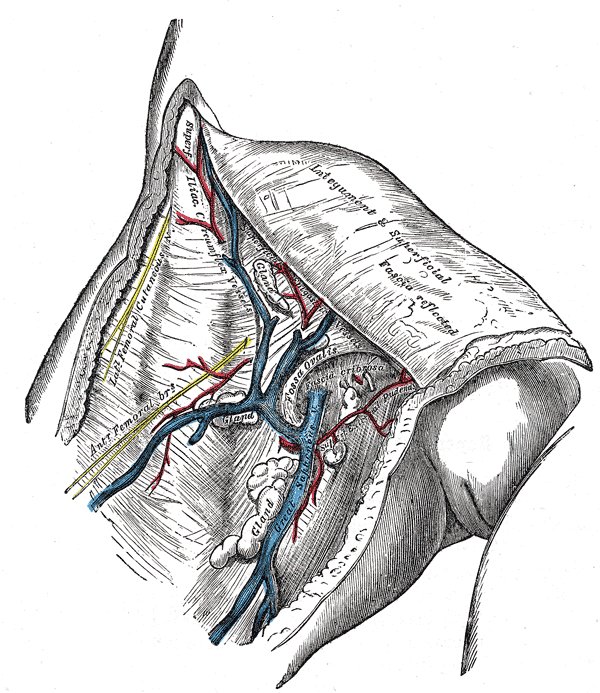
The great saphenous vein and its tributaries at the fossa ovalis.

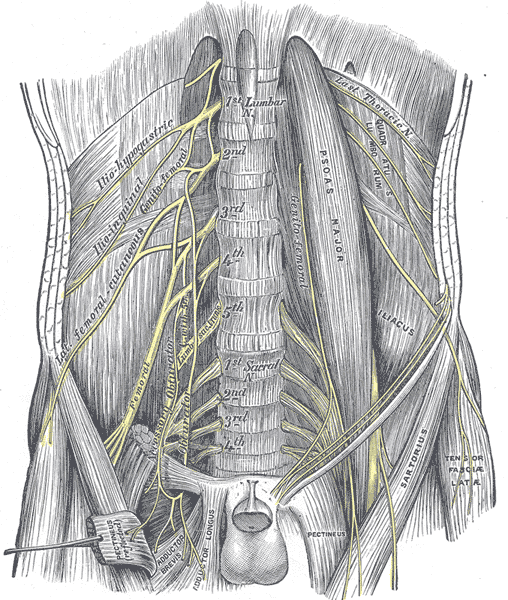
The lumbar plexus and its branches.

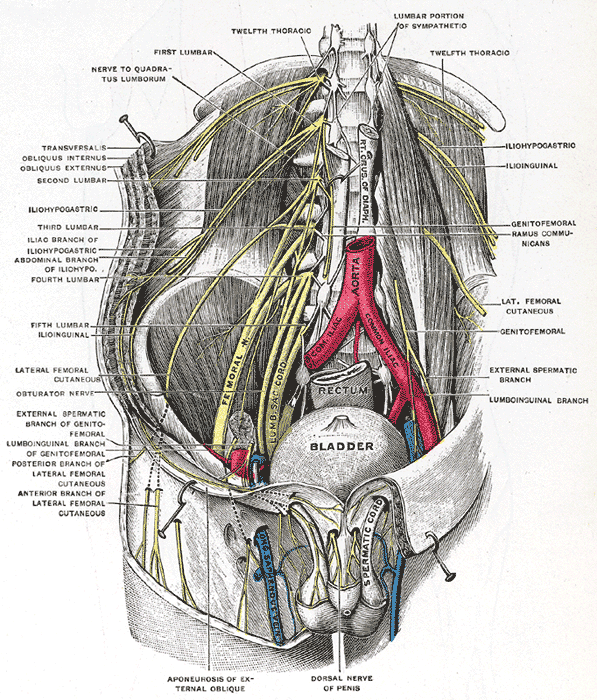
Deep and superficial dissection of the lumbar plexus.

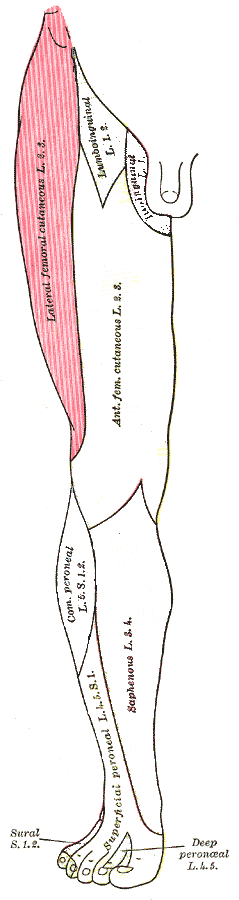
Diagram of segmental distribution of the lateral cutaneous nerve (shaded) and other nerves of the right leg. Front view.

Cutaneous nerves of the right lower extremity. Front and posterior views.

== See also ==
- Cutaneous nerve
- Posterior cutaneous nerve of thigh
- Meralgia paraesthetica
- Inguinal ligament
- Lumbar plexus
