= Migraine surgery =

Medical procedure for prevention of migraines

Migraine surgery is a surgical operation undertaken with the goal of reducing or preventing migraines. Migraine surgery most often refers to surgical nerve decompression of one or several nerves in the head and neck which have been shown to trigger migraine symptoms in many migraine sufferers. Following the development of nerve decompression techniques for the relief of migraine pain in the year 2000, these procedures have been extensively studied and shown to be effective in appropriate candidates. The nerves that are most often addressed in migraine surgery are found outside of the skull, in the face and neck, and include the supra-orbital and supra-trochlear nerves in the forehead, the zygomaticotemporal nerve and auriculotemporal nerves in the temple region, and the greater occipital, lesser occipital, and third occipital nerves in the back of the neck. Nerve impingement in the nasal cavity has additionally been shown to be a trigger of migraine symptoms.

== Indications and patient selection ==
Migraine surgery is usually reserved for migraine patients who fail more conservative therapy or who cannot tolerate the side effects of drugs used to treat their migraines. Appropriate patients are screened using injections of local anesthesia to provide a temporary nerve block. In some cases, Botox may be used to provide temporary decompression of the nerve. Patients who respond to nerve blocks often see an immediate though temporary reduction in their pain by "shutting off" the nerve that is triggering the migraine, while pain relief following Botox injections is provided by relaxation of nearby muscle tissue that may be compressing the nerve. Patients who respond well to these screening procedures are felt to be excellent candidates for migraine surgery.

== Surgical procedures ==
Migraine surgery is an outpatient procedure which addresses peripheral nerves through limited incisions. Depending on the symptoms of the patient and the screening results following nerve blocks or Botox, different areas of the head and neck may be addressed to treat the nerves found to be the migraine trigger in a given patient. Migraine surgery is always individualized to each patient's symptoms and anatomy.

=== Anterior nerves ===
Nerves found in the forehead (supra-orbital and supra-trochlear nerves) are either addressed using endoscopic surgery or by using an incision in the crease of the upper eyelid. Structures that are found pressing on the nerves here are released and may include bone at the upper orbit, fascia, blood vessels, or muscle tissue. The supra-orbital and supra-trochlear nerves travel through the corrugator supercilii muscle which enables frowning of the brow. These nerves are released from these muscles so they may lie free of pressure from these muscle structures. Small blood vessels which travel with these nerves may be divided to prevent pressure as well. In the bony notch where these nerves exit the eye socket, small pieces of bone or connective tissue may be removed so undue pressure is not placed on the nerves in this region.

=== Nerves of the temple region ===
The zygomaticotemporal nerve and auriculotemporal nerves are found in areas between the top of the ear and the lateral portion of the eye, in different areas of the temple. These nerves can also be addressed by endoscopic techniques, or well hidden small incisions. Blood vessels next to or crossing these nerves are often found to be the source of compression, and these blood vessels may be divided to prevent irritation of these nerves. Associated temporal muscle release in the region of these nerves may also be indicated. Because these nerves are very small and provide feeling to small regions of the scalp, they are often cut or avulsed, allowing the ends to retract into muscle tissue to prevent neuroma formation.

=== Posterior nerves ===
Chronic irritation of the occipital nerves is called occipital neuralgia and is frequently the cause of migraine symptoms. The greater occipital and third occipital nerves are addressed through an incision at the base of the scalp in the upper neck by either a vertical or transverse incision. Incisions are usually placed within the hairline. The greater occipital nerve travels through several muscle layers (including the trapezius muscle and splenius capitis muscle) where it is often compressed, and therefore surgery for this nerve involves releasing it from tight muscle and fascia in the upper neck. Blood vessels found crossing the nerve such as the occipital artery may be divided in order to avoid chronic pressure and irritation of the greater occipital nerve. The third occipital nerve is a small nerve that travels near the greater occipital nerve and may treated similarly in order to alleviate chronic irritation.

The lesser occipital nerve is a small nerve that has additionally been found to be associated with migraine pain. This nerve is found near the sternocleidomastoid muscle and may be decompressed or divided here through a small incision. Alternative techniques localize the lesser occipital nerve through the same posterior hairline incision as the greater occipital nerves. As this small nerve provides feeling for a small region of the scalp, the minimal numbness resulting from the division of this nerve often goes un-noticed.Neurostimulation surgery, in which electrical stimulators are implemented over the occipital and/or superorbital nerves, has also been used to treat migraines, although there is scarce evidence for the effectiveness of this procedure.

=== Nerves of the nose ===
The nerves of the nasal lining may be impinged by structures in the nose such as the nasal septum and turbinates. Nasal surgery to decompress these regions may include septoplasty, turbinectomy, or other rhinoplasty procedures.

== Surgical outcomes ==
Though initially thought to be experimental surgery, the benefits of migraine surgery have now been well documented. Followup data has shown that 88% of migraine surgery patients experienced a positive response to the procedure after 5 years. 29% of patients have been shown to achieve complete elimination of their migraine disease, while an additional 59% of patients reported a significant decrease in their pain and symptoms 5 years following their migraine surgery. 12% of patients undergoing migraine surgery reported no change in their symptoms after 5 years.

Migraine surgery has additionally been studied in a socioeconomic context and has been shown to reduce both direct and indirect costs associated with migraine disease. Such costs after migraine surgery have been shown to be reduced by a median of $3,949 per patient per year.

=== Surgery ===
Chronic daily headache is a major worldwide health problem that affects 3–5% of the population and results in substantial disability. Advances in the medical management of headache disorders have meant that a substantial proportion of patients can be effectively treated with medical treatments. However, a significant proportion of these patients are intractable to drug treatment. The successful use of surgical procedures for the treatment of migraine is becoming more frequently reported in the medical literature, particularly for those patients who do not respond to medication. There is resistance in some quarters the concept of surgery for migraine, on the grounds that it is unnecessarily invasive. On the contrary, others argue that to undergo a relatively minor and minimally invasive once-off surgical procedure is not as invasive as having to permanently take chronic medication, which in many people has unpleasant or intolerable side effects, or is ineffective. The answer to this conundrum lies however in informed consent - the patient must be advised of all the possibilities, and of all the pros and cons of each option, so that an informed choice can be made. In some instances, patients opt for the drug route, and only take the surgical option when the medication has not had the desired effect. For others, the thought of being on chronic medication is anathema.

==== Arterial pain ====
In many migraine sufferers, the pain originates in painfully dilated extracranial terminal branches of the external carotid artery. That vasodilatation is an important factor in migraine is further confirmed by the fact that the most widely used migraine rescue medications, the ergots, the triptans, and the promising newer drugs, the gepants, possess one significant common denominator: they all potently constrict abnormally dilated extracranial arteries while simultaneously reducing or eliminating migraine pain. Furthermore, to date all migraine-provoking agents have had vasodilating properties.

===== Arterial surgery =====
In patients where the pain has been positively diagnosed to originate from the scalp arteries (the terminal branches of the external carotid artery), the preventive treatment of choice is surgical cauterization of the responsible arteries – known as the Shevel Procedure.

In order to pinpoint the position of the relevant arteries, a three-dimensional CT scan is done, which allows accurate visualization of the course of each artery. This is necessary, as the course of the arteries varies from person to person, and even from side to side in the same individual. During surgery, the position of the artery is further verified by means of a Doppler Flowmeter, with which one can hear the blood flowing through the vessel. Use of the three-dimensional CT scan and the Doppler Flowmeter allows the surgeon to make use of the smallest possible incision, so the procedure is minimally invasive. The most common vessels involved in the pain of migraine are the terminal branches of the external carotid artery, and in particular, the superficial temporal artery and its frontal branch, and the occipital artery, but the maxillary, posterior auricular, supra-orbital, and supra-trochlear branches may also be involved. These vessels are subcutaneous (just under the skin) and the small incisions required to access them and the minimally invasive nature of the procedure means that the surgery can be done in a day facility. As these vessels have no connection with the arterial supply to the brain, the Shevel Procedure is exceedingly safe with no unpleasant side effects. The cosmetic effect is excellent as most of the incisions are within the hairline.

Arterial surgery is only indicated once there is positive confirmation that the arteries are indeed the source of pain. Some migraine sufferers have a visibly distended artery on the temple during an attack, which confirms that the arteries are involved. The distention usually subsides as the pain is controlled by vasoconstrictor drugs (ergots or triptans). In some, this artery is always visible, but it is only when it becomes distended during an attack that it becomes important for diagnosis. Patients who take triptans or ergots for relief of migraine pain are also prime candidates for arterial surgery. The reason for this is that the action of these drugs is to constrict the painfully dilated branches of the external carotid artery - the same arteries that are targeted by the surgery. The purpose of the surgery is to provide a permanent 'triptan or ergot effect'. Most of these arteries are in the scalp and are readily accessible to minimally invasive surgery. This treatment modality is of particular value in: 1) patients who have not responded to preventive drug therapy, 2) patients who are unable to use drug therapy because they experience unacceptable side effects, 3) patients who have to make too frequent use of abortive drugs such as the triptans or ergots, and 4) patients who would prefer not to be on permanent medication. Included in this category are those with Chronic Daily Headache (headache on more than 15 days per month) and patients with what is known as "refractory headache" - headache that has not benefited from any other form of treatment. Elliot Shevel, a South African surgeon, showed that patients with chronic migraine experienced a significant reduction in pain levels and significant improvement in their quality of life following the surgery.

==== Muscle surgery - trigger site release ====
Trigger site release was first described by a plastic surgeon, Dr Bahaman Guyuron. The theory is that trigger sites (TSs) exist where sensory nerves are being compressed by a surrounding muscle. The nerve becomes inflamed, and a cascade of events is initiated, triggering migraine headaches. Thus far, three muscle trigger areas where the nerve passes through a muscle have been identified as surgical candidates – where the a) greater occipital nerve pierces through the semispinalis capitis muscle, b) the zygomaticotemporal nerve passes through the temporalis muscle, and c) the supraorbital/supratrochlear nerves pass through the glabellar muscle group (the corrugator supercilii, depressor supercilii, and procerus muscles). Several large series of studies have been conducted to evaluate the efficacy of surgical obliteration of trigger points. Almost all demonstrated more than 90% response in a carefully selected group of patients who have a positive response to Botox therapy, with at least 50% improvement to complete resolution of migraine pain.

===== Details of the procedures =====
Patients have to be screened preoperatively with a full neurological examination, and subsequent Botox injection. A positive response to Botox has been an accurate predictor of a successful outcome. Single or multiple TSs may be treated. Migraine headaches can start in one area depending on their corresponding trigger site and spread to the rest of the head. It is important to identify the initial trigger sites rather than address all the areas of pain, after the inflammation involves the entire trigeminal tree. Forehead migraine headaches: In the glabellar area the supra-orbital and supra-trochlear nerves are skeletonized by resecting the corrugator and depressor supercilii muscle using an endoscopic approach similar that of used for cosmetic forehead lift. Temporal migraine headaches: The temporal area, where the zygomaticotemporal branch of trigeminal nerve passes through the temporalis muscle, is addressed using a similar endoscopic approach but involves removing a segment of the nerve rather than transecting the muscle. This results in a slight sensory defect over temporal skin area, but cross-innervation from other sensory nerves helps to limit the damage. Occipital migraine headaches: The posterior neck area where the greater occipital nerve passes through the semispinalis capitis muscle is addressed with an open surgical approach with resection of a small segment of the semispinalis muscle and shielding the nerves with a subcutaneous adipose flap.

A further trigger point, not involving muscles, has been identified in the nose of patients who have significant nasal septum deviation with enlargement of the turbinates. The nasal trigger points where enlarged turbinates are in contact with the nasal septum are addressed with a septoplasty and a turbinectomy.

==== Patent foramen ovale closure ====
There is evidence that a link exists between migraine with aura and the presence of a patent foramen ovale (PFO), a hole between the upper chambers (the atria) of the heart. It is estimated that 20-25% of the general population in the United States has a PFO. Medical research studies have shown that migraineurs are twice as likely as the general population to have a PFO, that over 50% of sufferers of migraine with aura have a PFO, that patients with a PFO are 5.1 times more likely to suffer from migraines and 3.2 times more likely to have migraines with aura than the general population, and that patients with migraine with aura are much more likely to have a large opening than the general PFO population. There is however some controversy, as some have shown a link, while others have failed to demonstrate a link.

===== Details of the procedure =====
A catheter is advanced up to the hole in the heart after it is inserted in a vein in the leg. Through the catheter, a device is then placed which blocks the hole between the left and right atria of the heart. There are a number of different devices being used or tested, the Coherex FlatStent PFO Closure System, the CardioSEAL, and the AMPLATZER PFO Occluder device.

Migraine frequency and severity has been shown to be reduced if the hole (PFO) is patched surgically. It has been suggested that there is an advantage to non-pharmacological migraine relief - "in contrast to drugs, PFO closure appears highly effective against migraines and usually has no side effects". Because PFO closure continues to prove successful, new devices are being produced to make the surgery easier to perform and less invasive. Some studies, however, have emphasized caution in relating PFO closure surgeries to migraines, stating that the favorable studies have been poorly designed retrospective studies and that insufficient evidence exists to justify the dangerous procedure. There have however been reports of short-term increases in migraine frequency and intensity following the surgery.

==== Nerve stimulation ====
===== Occipital nerve stimulation =====
Published reports from open-label studies have demonstrated possible efficacy of ONS in a variety of primary headache disorders, including chronic migraine. ONS for the treatment of medically intractable headaches was introduced by Weiner and Reed ONS is typically performed with the equipment normally used for spinal cord stimulation (SCS), which includes electrodes and their leads, anchors to fasten the leads to connective tissue, and the implantable pulse generator (IPG).

===== Details of the procedure =====
Electrodes are placed subcutaneously (under the skin) superficial to the cervical muscle fascia, transverse to the affected occipital nerve trunk at the level of C1, usually using fluoroscopic guidance. The standard procedure is typically performed in two stages. The first stage, carried out under local anesthesia with sedation, is used to test the stimulation and determine optimal placement of electrodes. The second part, which involves insertion of the rest of the ONS system, is carried out under general anesthesia. However, a recent report of a small case series described successful placement of ONS systems entirely under general anesthesia while still achieving the desired occipital region stimulation.

===== When is ONS indicated? =====
A stimulation trial can be performed before the permanent implantation, with the view to improving selection of the candidates for a permanent stimulation. The procedure involves inserting percutaneous (through the skin) leads into the epidural space and externally powering them for 5–7 days. If the trial is successful in terms of significant pain improvement, the patient is offered a permanent implantation. However, in primary headache syndromes, unlike in neuropathic pain, there can be a considerable delay of several weeks to months before the response emerges and therefore the utility of a stimulation trial in selecting patients for permanent implantation remains questionable for now.

=== Procedures ===
==== Muscle relaxation ====
The involvement of the pericranial muscles in migraine has been well documented, and muscle relaxation techniques have been used successfully to prevent migraine.

===== Intra-oral appliances =====
Intra-oral appliance are designed to relax the pericranial muscles, which have been reported to be tender in 100% of migraine sufferers during an attack. There are a number of different designs, which have been reported to be effective in many migraine sufferers.

===== Biofeedback =====
Biofeedback is the process of gaining greater awareness of many physiological functions primarily using instruments that provide information on the activity of those same systems, with a goal of being able to manipulate them at will. Some of the processes that can be controlled include brainwaves, muscle tone, skin conductance, heart rate and pain perception. Biofeedback to induce muscle relaxation is widely used in migraine prevention.

===== Botulinum Toxin (Botox) =====
OnabotulinumtoxinA (trade name Botox) received FDA approval for treatment of chronic migraines (occurring more than 15 days per month) in 2010. The toxin is injected into the muscles of head and neck. Approval followed evidence presented to the agency from two studies funded by Allergan, Inc. showing an improvement in incidence of chronic migraines for migraine sufferers undergoing the Botox treatment. Since then, several randomized control trials have shown Botulinum Toxin Type A to improve headache symptoms and quality of life when used prophylactically for patients with chronic migraine

=== Arterial surgery ===
Surgical cauterization of the superficial blood vessels of the scalp (the terminal branches of the external carotid artery) is only carried out if it has been established with certainty that these vessels are indeed the source of pain. It is a safe and relatively atraumatic procedure which can be performed in a day facility.

=== Nerve decompression ===
Migraine surgery which involves decompression of certain nerves around the head and neck may be an option in certain people who do not improve with medications. It is only effective in those who respond well to Botox injections in specific areas.

=== Closure of patent foramen ovale ===
There also appears to be a causal link between the presence of a patent foramen ovale (PFO) and migraine. There is evidence that the correction of the congenital heart defect, PFO, reduces migraine frequency and severity. Recent studies have advised caution, though, in relation to PFO closure for migraine, as insufficient evidence exists to justify this dangerous procedure.

== See also ==
- Management of migraine
