= Neck-tongue syndrome =

Rare disorder involving neck pain

- Specialty: Neurosurgery
- Symptoms: Neck pain, occipital neuralgia, numbness or tingling in the tongue.
- Usual onset: 8-15 years or after trauma
- Duration: Pain lasted from several seconds up to several minutes.
- Types: Uncomplicated and Complicated
- Causes: Genetics
- Frequency: Rare

Neck-tongue syndrome (NTS), which was first recorded in 1980, is a rare disorder characterized by neck pain with or without tingling and numbness of the tongue on the same side as the neck pain. Sharp lateral movement of the head triggers the pain, usually lasting from a few seconds to a few minutes. Headaches may occur with the onset of NTS. The typical age of onset is around adolescence and may occur as early as 8–15 years old. However, clinical onset can occur earlier or later and NTS onset related to trauma can occur at any age, beginning after the incident.

== Inheritance ==
One case study suggested that neck tongue syndrome has an autosomal dominant inheritance pattern. Eight patient cases were examined: 5 adolescents and 3 adults with NTS. All of the adolescents had normal neurologic examinations and no evident anatomical defects. The adults, who were the parents of three of the adolescents, all had symptoms during adolescence but were asymptomatic as adults. Seeing as NTS is believed to have an autosomal dominant genetic pattern, the many differences observed regarding the symptoms of NTS can be explained as variable expressivity. Some of these differences include the age of onset, the side of the neck/face where the pain is located and the frequency of attacks.

== Diagnosis ==
There are two known types of NTS: complicated and uncomplicated. Complicated NTS is secondary to another disease process while uncomplicated NTS is either hereditary, related to physical trauma, or is idiopathic, meaning that it arises spontaneously with no known cause. Due to the fact that complicated NTS is often correlated with an underlying disease, it is important to have a differential diagnosis. Diseases often related to NTS include cervical artery dysfunction, vertebrobasilar insufficiency (VBI), ligamentous insufficiency, Chiari-1 malformation, and transient ischemic attack. However, it is thought that the majority of NTS cases are due to genetics, in which loose ligaments cause temporary misalignments with the atlanto-axial joint while the neck is rotating. Subsequently, numbness of the tongue is due to either subluxation of the atlanto-axial joint or restriction of the second cervical nerve.

The cervical vertebrae are indicated in red. The second cervical nerve is thought to be involved in Neck-Tongue syndrome.

In accordance with the International Classification of Headache Disorders, third edition (ICHD-3), diagnostic criteria for NTS are the following:

A. at least two episodes fulfilling criteria B-D

B. sharp or stabbing unilateral pain (there may or may not be simultaneous dysesthesia)

C. precipitated by sudden turning of the neck

D. lasting from seconds to several minutes

E. not better accounted for by another ICHD-3 diagnosis.

== Treatment ==
Due to the rarity of this syndrome, treatments have been decided on a case-by-case basis. Spinal manipulative therapy and physiotherapy exercises have been used in those with uncomplicated neck-tongue syndrome, resulting in improvements in symptoms. Other methods of symptom management have included: non-steroidal anti-inflammatory drugs, gabapentin, steroid injections and cervical collars. One case report of a 54 year old woman with persistent symptoms, who did not respond to use of a cervical collar or pharmacological pain management treatments, underwent a bilateral C2 spinal nerve resection. She experienced partial relief of symptoms after recovery. Examination of the resected nerve fibers showed loss of both myelinated and unmyelinated nerve fibers, this is a possible explanation for the symptoms associated with NTS, however, further study is needed for a definitive answer. Since NTS is a rare disorder, prognoses differ for each individual based on the suggested cause of NTS symptoms and the form of treatment used. However, it has been reported that familial forms of NTS often exhibit symptoms during adolescence, which spontaneously resolve during adulthood.
