= Occipital nerve stimulation =

Implanted neurostimulation treatment for chronic migraine and occipital neuralgia

- Other names: Peripheral nerve stimulation of the occipital nerves
- Specialty: Neurology, neurosurgery, pain management
- Uses: Intractable chronic migraine, occipital neuralgia
- Types: Neurostimulation

Occipital nerve stimulation (ONS), also called peripheral nerve stimulation (PNS) of the occipital nerves, is used to treat chronic migraine patients who have failed to respond to pharmaceutical treatments. The treatment involves the use of mild electrical impulses to stimulate the greater occipital nerve and lesser occipital nerve which are part of the peripheral nervous system and are located at the back of the head just above the neck area.

The electrical impulses are generated by a small device called a neurostimulator – similar to an artificial cardiac pacemaker – which is implanted in the buttock, chest, low abdomen, beneath the shoulder blade or below the clavicle. The electricity is delivered to the greater occipital nerve and lesser occipital nerve by small metal electrodes which are arranged on thin leads and implanted just under the skin. The intensity of the electrical impulses can be adjusted using a small remote control device.

== History ==
The history of PNS is thoroughly reported by Slavin, 2011. The use of PNS for chronic pain was first reported in 1967 by Wall and Sweet although the first implantations were performed in 1962 by Shelden. They demonstrated that electrical stimulation of peripheral nerves suppresses the perception of pain. A period of semi-experimental PNS usage continued for 15 – 20 years. During the latter half of the 1980s, PNS became an established surgical procedure. In the late 1990s, Weiner and Reed reported the percutaneous technique of inserting electrodes in the vicinity of the occipital nerves to treat occipital neuralgia. Weiner showed that placing a PNS electrode close to a nerve is effective for pain relief and a technically simple procedure. This pioneering work heralded the start of the modern era of PNS. It was 2003 before Popeney and Aló proposed using PNS for the treatment of chronic migraine. Subsequently, prospective randomized controlled trials were launched to gather additional clinical evidence.

This is further detailed in an article published by Cephalagia titled "Safety and efficacy of peripheral nerve stimulation of the occipital nerves for the management of chronic migraine: Results from a randomized, multicenter, double-blinded, controlled study."

In September 2011, St Jude Medical Inc. became the first company to receive European approval for the use of PNS in treating chronic migraine.

== Candidates for the therapy ==
Appropriate candidates for PNS of the occipital nerves for the treatment of chronic migraine must be diagnosed with chronic migraine which is classified as intractable.

Chronic migraine is defined by the International Headache Society (IHS) guidelines:

- 15 or more migraine (without aura) headache days per month for more than 3 months with headaches lasting at least 4–72 hours in duration
- At least 2 of the following: unilateral location, pulsating quality, moderate or severe pain intensity, aggravated by or causing avoidance of, routine physical activity (walking or climbing stairs)
  - During the headache, at least one of the following: nausea and/or vomiting, photophobia and phonophobia
- Not attributed to another disorder
- Absence of medication overuse

Intractable chronic migraine is generally defined as chronic migraine with failure of three or more preventive drugs and at least moderate disability determined using a validated migraine disability instrument (e.g. MIDAS or HIT-6).

== Procedure ==
=== Pre-operation ===
Prior to the implantation, patients usually undergo a psychological assessment to assess their well-being and mental health. The risks of the procedure will be discussed and the patient will be asked for their informed consent. Risks that may be highlighted include no guarantee of effectiveness, infection, nerve damage, painful direct muscle stimulation, lead movement with loss of stimulation, lead fracture, battery failure, eventual need for battery replacement, hematoma and seroma formation.

=== Implantation ===
In most cases, a trial (test) lead placement is performed in order to assess whether the stimulation will work as expected. Local anesthetic is applied to the back of the neck and a Tuohy needle is advanced towards the location of the greater occipital nerve and lesser occipital nerve under fluoroscopic guidance. When the location is confirmed, a temporary lead is placed through the needle before the needle is carefully removed. Electrical impulses are sent through the lead and its position is adjusted until the patient reports a "pins-and-needles" sensation, called paresthesia, across the areas of the nerves. If paresthesia is successfully achieved in the right place, permanent leads are usually implanted at a later date. In some cases, the trial leads are left in for up to one week to see whether there is any relief of symptoms.

Permanent lead placement may be carried out under general anesthetic or local anesthetic with sedation. First, a small incision is made at the base of the skull, then a Tuohy needle is advanced under fluoroscopic guidance towards the location of the greater occipital nerve and lesser occipital nerve on one side of the head. When the lead is adequately positioned through the needle under fluoroscopic guidance, the needle is carefully removed and the lead is fixed in place. Since most patients require two leads, a second lead is usually inserted and fixed in place on the other side of the head in the same way. The lead(s) are then tunneled to a neurostimulator device which is usually implanted the buttock, chest, low abdomen, beneath the shoulder blade or below the clavicle.

== Clinical evidence ==
Results from three randomized controlled trials have been published. One randomized controlled trial of 157 patients with chronic migraine was published in October 2012. Participants were implanted with the device and then randomized to have the device turned on (the treatment group) or off (the control group) for 12 weeks. After week 12, participants received active treatment until week 52. All participants had trial stimulation to ensure correct position of electrodes. A total of 153 participants completed 12 weeks in the trial. There was a statistically significant difference (p<0.05) between the number of patients in the treatment group]and control group at the 30% reduction in pain level using the Visual Analogue Scale (VAS). In addition the study showed that, on average, the treatment group (device on) had 6.1 fewer days of headache days per month which was more than double the average reduction for the control group (device off), which is statistically significant (p<0.001). The clinical study investigators reported that the overall rate of serious device and procedure related adverse events was 1% and that these included one infection and one case of post-operative pain which required additional hospitalization.

In February 2011, the ONSTIM clinical study investigators reported three-month results from a randomized controlled trial of patients with chronic migraine. Participants were first given occipital nerve block. Those who responded were randomized into three groups. The first group was a treatment group (33 participants) and received adjustable stimulation. The other two groups were control groups and received sham stimulation for one minute per day or standard medical management (17 participants each). Patients who achieved a 50% or greater reduction in their number of headache days per month or a three-point or greater reduction in average overall pain intensity compared with baseline were defined as responders to the therapy. 39% of patients in the adjustable stimulation group were responders, 6% in the sham stimulation group and 0% in the medical management group. The differences between the responder rates in the treatment group and control groups were statistically significant. Other outcome measures, such as number of headache days, were not statistically significantly different between the groups. However, the percentage reduction in headache days was 27% for the treatment group and less than 9% for each control group, showing a numerical advantage for the treatment group. No unanticipated device adverse events were reported. Movement of the lead occurred in 24% of subjects.

In December 2009, the PRISM study investigators reported three-month results in abstract form from a randomized controlled trial of 125 patients with chronic migraine. Patients were randomized into two groups. One group was a treatment group and received active stimulation. The other was a control group and received sham stimulation. Patients in the treatment group reduced their number of migraine days per month by 5.5 from a baseline of 20.2 days per month. Patients in the control group reduced their number of migraine days per month by 3.9 from a baseline of 19.2 days per month. The difference between the two groups was not statistically significant.
