= Occipital nerve block =

Medical procedure

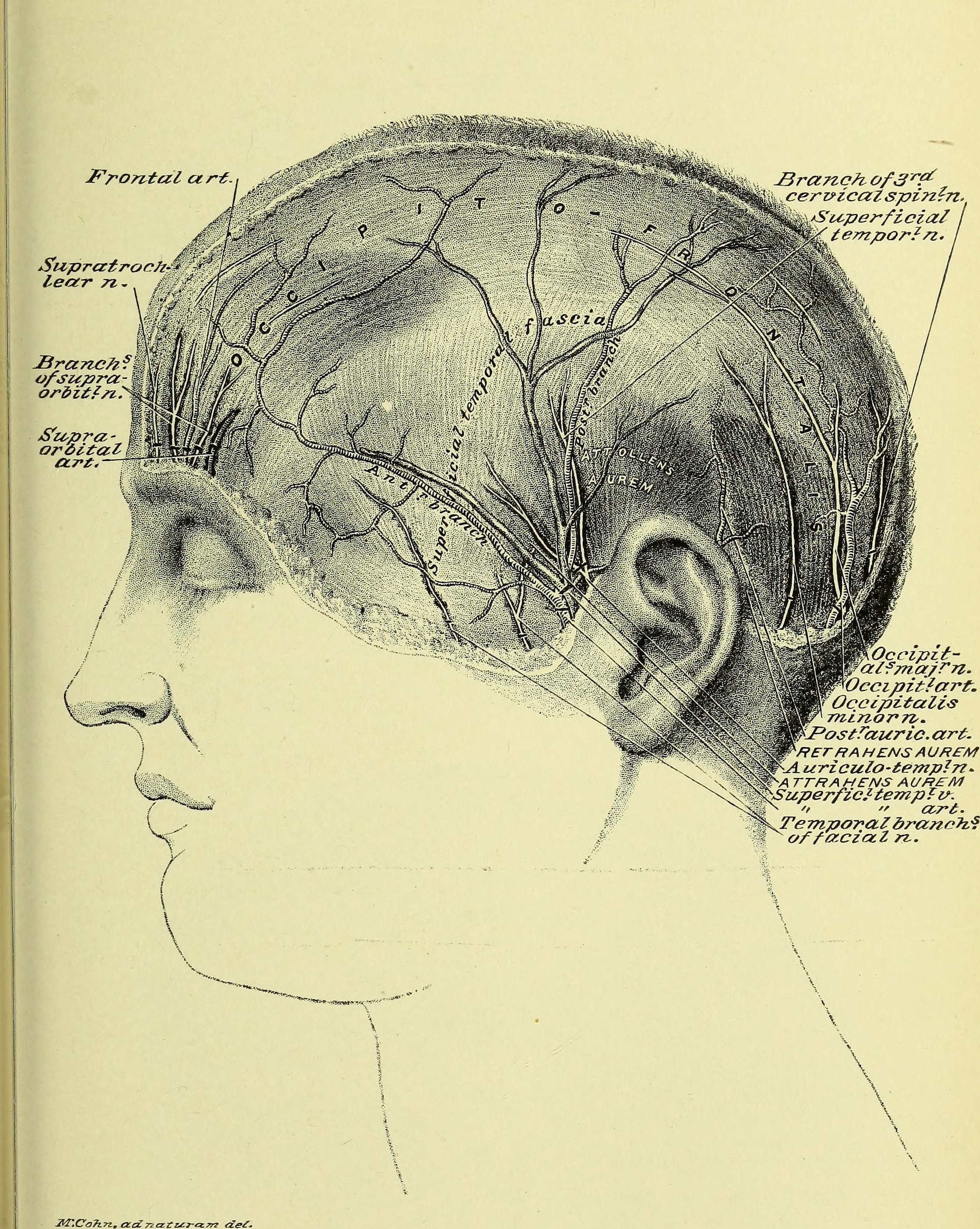
- Nerves innervating the cranial muscles. Occipital nerves to the bottom left originating from the neck.

Occipital nerve block is a procedure involving injection of steroids or anesthetics into regions of the greater occipital nerve and the lesser occipital nerve used to treat chronic headaches. Therapeutic nerve blocks utilized steroids to decrease inflammation around the nerve, while diagnostic occipital nerve blocks utilizes local anesthetic alone to prove that nerve irritation is the cause of a patient's pain. Diagnostic occipital nerve blocks are often used to screen for further treatments such as occipital nerve decompression, as a migraine surgery.

These nerves are located in the back of the head near in the suboccipital triangle along the line between the inion and the mastoid process. They innervate muscles in the suboccipital and posterior scalp regions. The injection will either block pain signals or reduce swelling and inflammation in these regions depending on the choice of injection. The procedure is helpful in treating occipital neuralgia and chronic headaches that arise from the neck.

== Medical uses ==
The efficacity of occipital nerve block is supported in migraines. In one study, 82% reported significant reduction of the pain.

== Procedure ==
The person is kept conscious for the duration of the procedure. A small gauge needle is inserted at points of the greater and lesser occipital nerves down to the periosteum of the occiput. Some pain may be felt during the insertion of the needle through the skin. Injected anesthetics give pain relief almost immediately while steroid injections take 3–5 days to provide relief. The procedure has no major common complications, but some uncommon risks include bleeding, especially if on blood thinning medication, infection, and nerve damage.
