= Occipital nerve =

Occipital nerve may refer to:

- Greater occipital nerve
- Lesser occipital nerve
- Third occipital nerve
