= Brachial plexus block =

- Video of a brachial plexus block, using a portable ultrasound scanning device for localization of the nerves of the brachial plexus
- ICD-9-CM: 04.81
- MeSH: D009407

Brachial plexus block is a regional anesthesia technique that is sometimes employed as an alternative or as an adjunct to general anesthesia for surgery of the upper extremity. This technique involves the injection of local anesthetic agents in close proximity to the brachial plexus, temporarily blocking the sensation and ability to move the upper extremity. The subject can remain awake during the ensuing surgical procedure, or they can be sedated or even fully anesthetized if necessary.

There are several techniques for blocking the nerves of the brachial plexus. These techniques are classified by the level at which the needle or catheter is inserted for injecting the local anesthetic — interscalene block on the neck for example is considered the second most complete postoperative analgesia, supraclavicular block immediately above the clavicle, infraclavicular block below the clavicle and axillary block in the axilla (armpit).

== Indications ==
General anesthesia may result in low blood pressure, undesirable decreases in cardiac output, central nervous system depression, respiratory depression, loss of protective airway reflexes (such as coughing), need for tracheal intubation and mechanical ventilation, and residual anesthetic effects. The most important advantage of brachial plexus block is that it allows for the avoidance of general anesthesia and therefore its attendant complications and side effects. Although brachial plexus block is not without risk, it usually affects fewer organ systems than general anesthesia.

Brachial plexus blockade may be a reasonable option when all of the following criteria are met:

- Surgery is expected to be limited to a region between the midpoint of the shoulder and the fingers
- There are no contraindications to a block such as infection at the intended injection site, significant bleeding disorder, anxiety, allergy or hypersensitivity to local anesthetics
- There will not be a need to perform an examination of the function of the blocked nerves immediately following the surgical procedure
- The patient prefers this technique over other available and reasonable approaches

== Anatomy ==
The brachial plexus is formed by the ventral rami of C5-C6-C7-C8-T1, occasionally with small contributions by C4 and T2. There are multiple approaches to blockade of the brachial plexus, beginning proximally with the interscalene block and continuing distally with the supraclavicular, infraclavicular, and axillary blocks. The concept behind all of these approaches to the brachial plexus is the existence of a sheath encompassing the neurovascular bundle extending from the deep cervical fascia to slightly beyond the borders of the axilla.

Anatomical illustration of the brachial plexus with areas of roots, trunks, divisions and cords marked. Clicking on names of branches will link to their Wikipedia entry.

== Techniques ==
Brachial plexus block is typically performed by an anesthesiologist. To achieve an optimal block, the tip of the needle should be close to the nerves of the plexus during the injection of local anesthetic solution. Commonly employed techniques for obtaining such a needle position include transarterial, elicitation of a paresthesia, and use of a peripheral nerve stimulator or a portable ultrasound scanning device. If the needle is close to or contacts a nerve, the subject may experience a paresthesia (a sudden tingling sensation, often described as feeling like "pins and needles" or like an electric shock) in the arm, hand, or fingers. Injection close to the point of elicitation of such a paresthesia may result in a good block. A peripheral nerve stimulator connected to an appropriate needle allows emission of electric current from the needle tip. When the needle tip is close to or contacts a motor nerve, characteristic contraction of the innervated muscle may be elicited. Modern portable ultrasound devices allow the user to visualize internal anatomy, including the nerves to be blocked, neighboring anatomic structures and the needle as it approaches the nerves. Observation of local anesthetic surrounding the nerves during ultrasound-guided injection is predictive of a successful block. Appropriate block per site-specific procedure are listed in the following table:

Procedure Site	Interscalene	Supraclavicular	Infraclavicular	Axillary^{1}
Shoulder^{2}	++	+^{3}		
Arm^{2}	+	++	+	
Elbow^{2}		++	++	+
Forearm^{2}		+	++	++
Hand^{2}		+	+	++

1. Include musculocutaneous nerve 2. Include T1-T2 if block is anesthetic 3. Include C3-C4 if block is anesthetic

=== Interscalene block ===
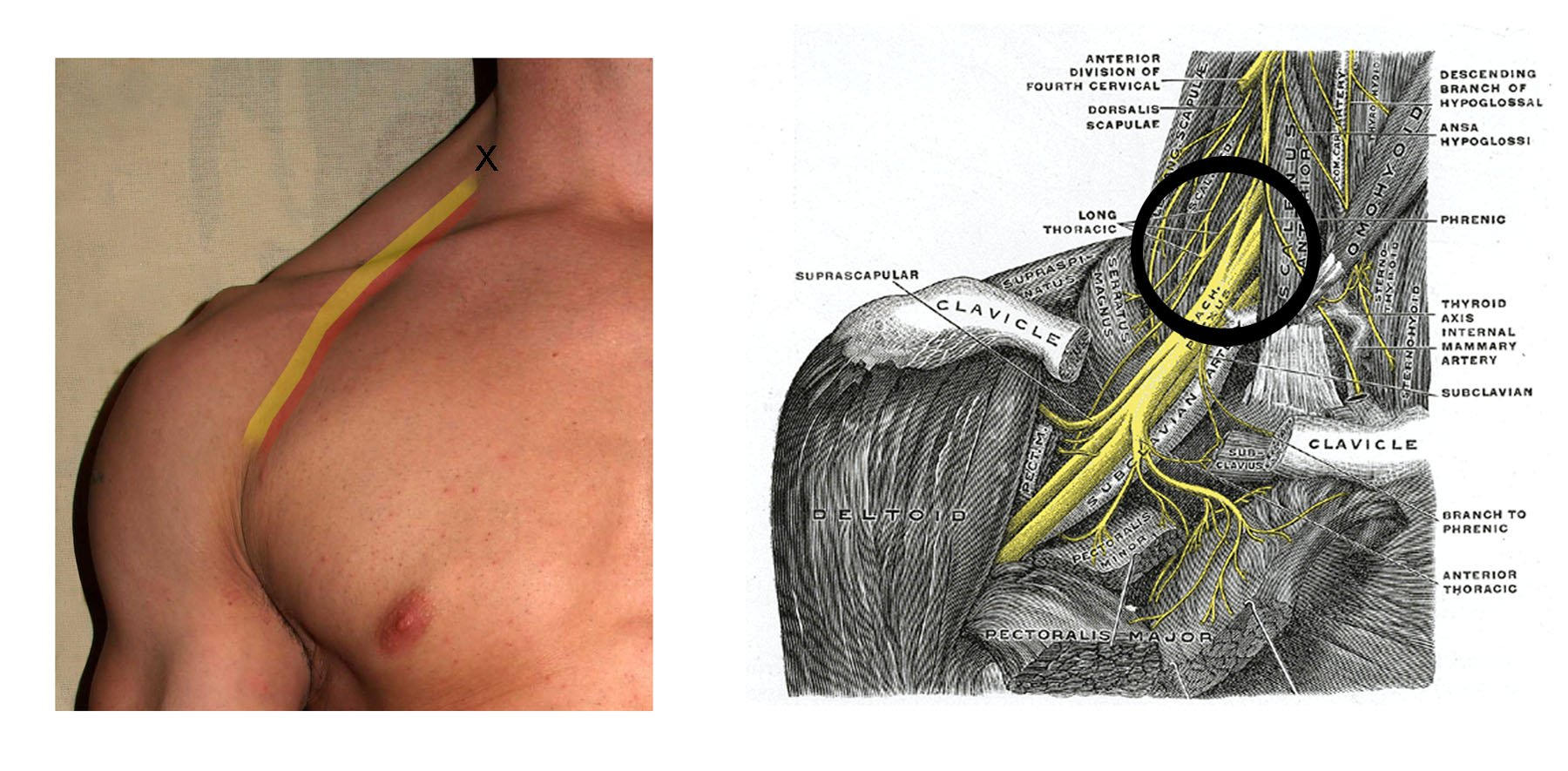
Left: the red line corresponds to the course of the subclavian artery, while the yellow line represents the brachial plexus and the "X" represents the site of entry of the needle when performing an interscalene block. Right: diagram of the course of the brachial plexus in relation to other important anatomic structures in the right side of the neck.

The interscalene block is performed by injecting local anesthetic to the nerves of the brachial plexus as it passes through the groove between the anterior and middle scalene muscles, at the level of the cricoid cartilage. This block is particularly useful in providing anesthesia and postoperative analgesia for surgery to the clavicle, shoulder, and arm. Advantages of this block include rapid blockade of the shoulder region, and relatively easily palpable anatomical landmarks. Disadvantages of this block include inadequate anesthesia in the distribution of the ulnar nerve, which makes this an unreliable block for operations involving the forearm and hand.

Side effects

Temporary paresis (impairment of the function) of the thoracic diaphragm occurs in virtually all people who have undergone interscalene or supraclavicular brachial plexus block. Significant respiratory impairment can be demonstrated in these people by pulmonary function testing. In certain people — such as those with severe chronic obstructive pulmonary disease — this can result in respiratory failure requiring tracheal intubation and mechanical ventilation until the block dissipates. Horner's syndrome may be observed if the local anesthetic solution tracks cephalad and blocks the stellate ganglion. This may be accompanied by difficulty swallowing and vocal cord paresis. These signs and symptoms are transient however, and do not commonly result in any long-term problems, although they may be significantly distressing to patients until the effects subside.

Contraindications

Contraindications include severe chronic obstructive pulmonary disease, and paresis of the phrenic nerve on the opposite side as the block.

=== Supraclavicular block ===
Providing a rapid onset of dense anesthesia of the arm with a single injection, the supraclavicular block is ideal for operations involving the arm and forearm, from the lower humerus down to the hand. The brachial plexus is most compact at the level of the trunks formed by the C5–T1 nerve roots, so nerve block at this level has the greatest likelihood of blocking all of the branches of the brachial plexus. This results in rapid onset times and, ultimately, high success rates for surgery and analgesia of the upper extremity, excluding the shoulder.

Surface landmarks can be used to identify the appropriate location for injection of local anesthetic, which is typically lateral to (outside) the lateral border of the sternocleidomastoid muscle and above the clavicle, with the first rib generally considered to represent the limit below which the needle must not be directed (the pleural cavity and uppermost part of the lung are located at this level). Palpation or ultrasound visualization of the subclavian artery just above the clavicle provides a useful anatomic landmark for locating the brachial plexus, which is lateral to the artery at this level. Proximity to the brachial plexus can be determined using by elicitation of a paresthesia, use of a peripheral nerve stimulator, or ultrasound guidance.

Compared to the interscalene block, the supraclavicular block — despite eliciting a more complete block of the median, radial ulnar and musculocutaneous nerves — does not improve postoperative analgesia. However, the supraclavicular block is often quicker to perform and may result in fewer side effects than the interscalene block. Compared to the infraclavicular block and axillary blocks, the successful achievement of adequate anesthesia for surgery of the upper extremity is about the same with supraclavicular block.

Unlike the interscalene block — which results in diaphragmatic hemiparesis in all subjects — only half of those who undergo supraclavicular block experience this side effect. Disadvantages of the supraclavicular block include the risk of pneumothorax, which is estimated to be between 1%–4% when using paresthesia or peripheral nerve stimulator guided techniques. Ultrasound guidance allows the operator to visualize the first rib and the pleura, thereby helping to ensure that the needle does not puncture the pleura; this presumably reduces the risk of pneumothorax.

=== Infraclavicular block ===
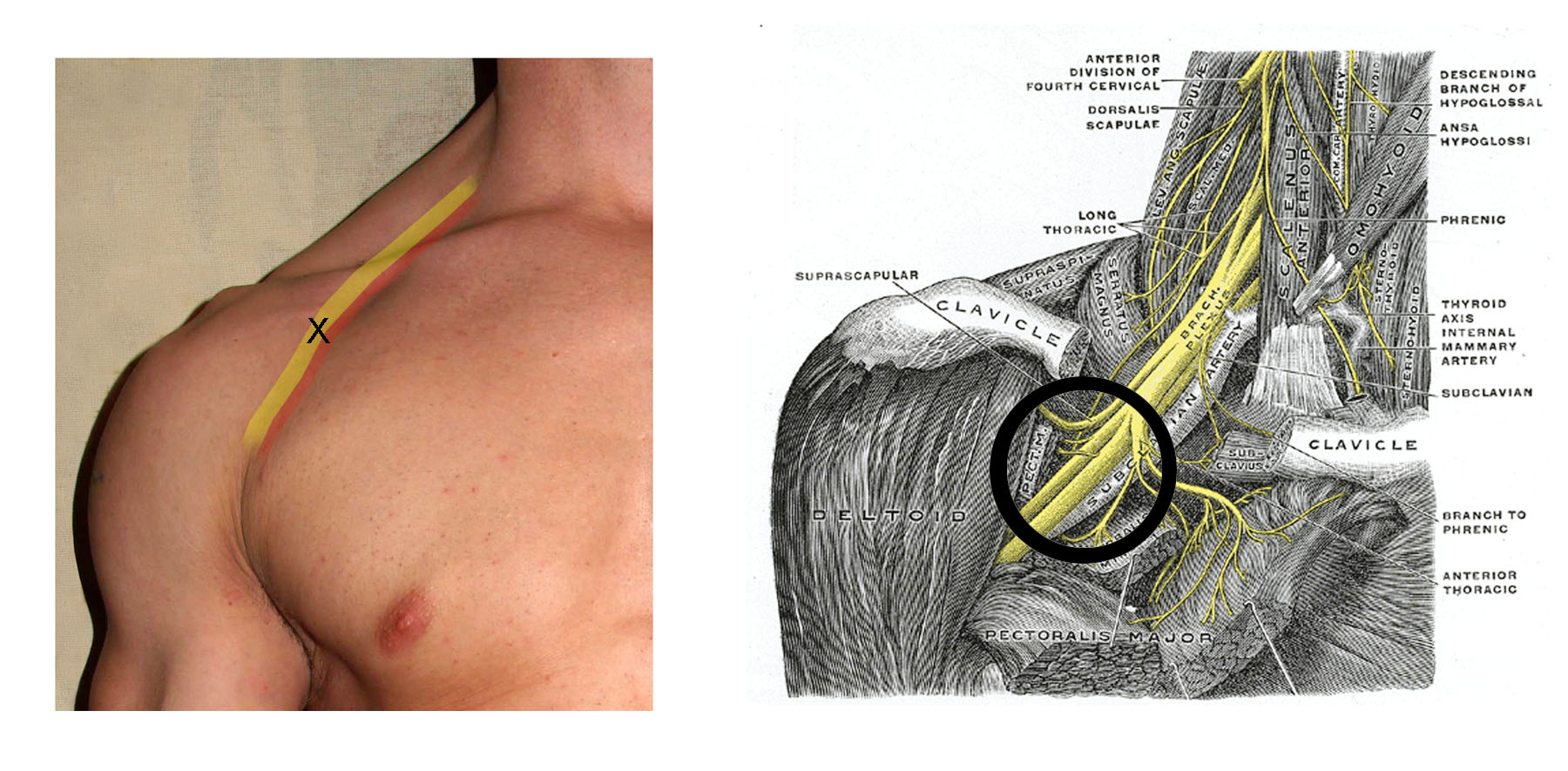
Left: the red line corresponds to the course of the subclavian artery, while the yellow line represents the brachial plexus and the "X" represents the site of entry of the needle when performing an infraclavicular block. Right: diagram of the course of the brachial plexus in relation to other important anatomic structures in the right infraclavicular fossa.

For infraclavicular block, current evidence suggests that — when using a peripheral nerve stimulator for nerve localization — a double-stimulation technique is better than a single-stimulation technique. When compared to a multiple-stimulation axillary block, infraclavicular block provides similar efficacy. However it may be associated with a shorter performance time and less procedure-related pain for the patient.

=== Axillary block ===
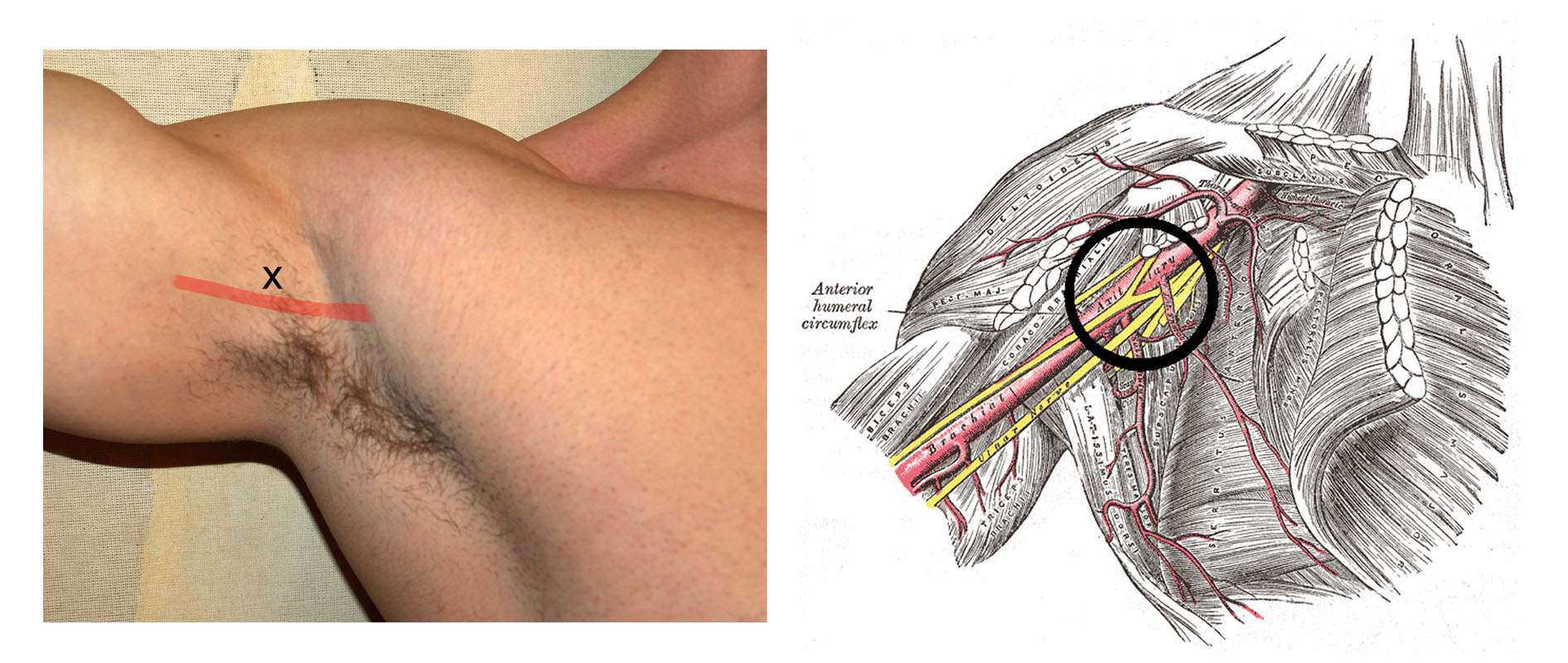
Left: the red line corresponds to the course of the axillary artery, while the "X" represents the site of entry of the needle when performing an axillary block. Right: diagram of the course of the axillary artery in relation to the brachial plexus in the right axilla.

The axillary block is particularly useful in providing anesthesia and postoperative analgesia for surgery to the elbow, forearm, wrist, and hand. The axillary block is also the safest of the four main approaches to the brachial plexus, as it does not risk paresis of the phrenic nerve, nor does it have the potential to cause pneumothorax. In the axilla, the nerves of the brachial plexus and the axillary artery are enclosed together in a fibrous sheath which is a continuation of the deep cervical fascia. The easily palpated axillary artery thus serves as a reliable anatomical landmark for this block, and the injection of local anesthetic close to this artery frequently leads to a good block of the brachial plexus. The axillary block is commonly performed due to its ease of performance and relatively high success rate.

Disadvantages of the axillary block include inadequate anesthesia in the distribution of the musculocutaneous nerve. This nerve supplies motor function to the biceps, brachialis, and coracobrachialis muscles and one of its branches supplies sensation to the skin of the forearm. If the musculocutaneous nerve is missed, it may be necessary to block this nerve separately. This can be accomplished by using a peripheral nerve stimulator to identify the location of the nerve as it passes through the coracobrachialis muscle. The intercostobrachial nerves (which are branches of the second and third intercostal nerves) are also frequently missed with the axillary block. Because these nerves supply sensation to the skin of the medial and posterior aspects of the arm and axilla, a tourniquet on the arm may be poorly tolerated in such cases. Subcutaneous injection of local anesthetic over the medial aspect of the arm in the axilla helps patients tolerate an arm tourniquet by blocking these nerves.

Single-injection techniques provide unreliable blockade in the areas supplied by the musculocutaneous and radial nerves. Current evidence suggests that a triple-stimulation technique — with injections on the musculocutaneous, median and radial nerves — is the best technique for the axillary block.

== Methods of nerve localization ==
Despite the fact that people have been performing brachial plexus blocks for over a hundred years, there is as yet no clear evidence to support the assertion that one method of nerve localization is better than another. There are however numerous case reports documenting cases in which use of a portable ultrasound scanning device has detected abnormal anatomy that would otherwise not have been evident using a "blind" approach. On the other hand, use of ultrasound may create a false sense of security in the operator, which may lead to errors, especially if the needle tip is not adequately visualized at all times.

For interscalene block, it is not clear whether nerve stimulation provides a better interscalene block than elicitation of paresthesiae. However, a recent study using ultrasound to follow the spread of local anesthetic demonstrated an improved success rate of the block (relative to blocks done with nerve stimulator alone) even at the inferior roots of the plexus.

For supraclavicular block, nerve stimulation with a minimal threshold of 0.9 mA can offer a dependable block. Although ultrasound-guided supraclavicular block has been shown to be a safe alternative to the peripheral nerve stimulator guided technique, there is little evidence to support that ultrasound guidance provides a better block, or is associated with fewer complications. There is some evidence to suggest that the use of ultrasound guidance in combination with nerve stimulation can shorten the performance time of supraclavicular block.

For axillary block, success rates are greatly improved with multiple injection techniques whether using nerve stimulation or ultrasound guidance.

== Special situations ==
The duration of a "single-shot" brachial plexus block is highly variable, commonly lasting anywhere from 45 minutes to 24 hours. The block can be extended by placing an indwelling catheter, which may be connected to a mechanical or electronic infusion pump for continuous administration of local anesthetic solution. A catheter may be inserted at the interscalene, supraclavicular, infraclavicular or axillary location, depending on the desired location of nerve block. Specific branches of the brachial plexus can also be blocked individually, for example the suprascapular nerve. The infusion of local anesthetic can be programmed to be a continuous flow or patient-controlled analgesia. In some cases, people can maintain the catheters and infusions at home after release from the facility where the surgery was performed.

== Complications ==
As with any procedure involving disruption of the integrity of the skin, brachial plexus block can be associated with infection or bleeding. In people who are using anticoagulant agents, there is a greater risk of complications related to bleeding.

Complications associated with brachial plexus block include intra-arterial or intravenous injection, which can lead to local anesthetic toxicity. This may be characterized by serious central nervous system problems such as epileptic seizure, central nervous system depression, and coma. Cardiovascular effects of local anesthetic toxicity include slowing of the heart rate and impairment of its ability to pump blood through the circulatory system, which may lead to circulatory collapse. In severe cases, cardiac dysrhythmia, cardiac arrest and death may occur. Other rare but serious complications from brachial plexus block include pneumothorax and persistent paresis of the phrenic nerve.

Complications associated with interscalene and supraclavicular blocks include inadvertent subarachnoid or epidural injection of local anesthetic, which can result in respiratory failure.

Because of the close proximity of the lung to the brachial plexus at the level of the clavicle, the complication most often associated with this block is pneumothorax — with a risk as high as 6.1%. Further complications of supraclavicular block include subclavian artery puncture, and spread of local anesthetic to cause paresis of the stellate ganglion, the phrenic nerve and recurrent laryngeal nerve.

== Alternatives ==
Depending on the circumstances, alternatives to brachial plexus block may include general anesthesia, monitored anesthesia care, Bier block, or local anesthesia.

== History ==
In 1855, Friedrich Gaedcke (1828–1890) became the first to chemically isolate cocaine, the most potent alkaloid of the coca plant. Gaedcke named the compound "erythroxyline". In 1884, Austrian ophthalmologist Karl Koller (1857–1944) instilled a 2% solution of cocaine into his own eye and tested its effectiveness as a local anesthetic by pricking the eye with needles. His findings were presented a few weeks later at annual conference of the Heidelberg Ophthalmological Society. The following year, William Halsted (1852–1922) performed the first brachial plexus block. Using a surgical approach in the neck, Halsted applied cocaine to the brachial plexus. In January 1900, Harvey Cushing (1869–1939) — who was at that time one of Halsted's surgical residents — applied cocaine to the brachial plexus prior to dividing it, during a forequarter amputation for sarcoma.

The first percutaneous supraclavicular block was performed in 1911 by German surgeon Diedrich Kulenkampff (1880–1967). Just as his older colleague August Bier (1861–1949) had done with spinal anesthesia in 1898, Kulenkampff subjected himself to the supraclavicular block. Later that year, Georg Hirschel (1875–1963) described a percutaneous approach to the brachial plexus from the axilla. In 1928, Kulenkampff and Persky published their experiences with a thousand blocks without apparent major complications. They described their technique with the patient in the sitting position or in the supine position with a pillow between the shoulders. The needle was inserted above the midpoint of the clavicle where the pulse of the subclavian artery could be felt and it was directed medially toward the second or third thoracic spinous process.

By the late 1940s, clinical experience with brachial plexus block in both peacetime and wartime surgery was extensive, and new approaches to this technique began to be described. For example, In 1946, F. Paul Ansbro was the first to describe a continuous brachial plexus block technique. He secured a needle in the supraclavicular fossa and attached tubing connected to a syringe through which he could inject incremental doses of local anesthetic. The subclavian perivascular block was first described by Winnie and Collins in 1964. This approach became popular due to its lower risk of pneumothorax compared to the traditional Kulenkampff approach. The infraclavicular approach was first developed by Raj. In 1977, Selander described a technique for continuous brachial plexus block using an intravenous catheter secured in the axilla. In 1977, James K. Sims described the use of the coracoid process of the scapula as a landmark for the performance of brachial plexus block. The Sims approach, now referred to as Infracoracoid Block has certain advantages: a) The needle tip is directed away from the apex of the lung, not toward it, b) the skin at the point of initial needle penetration is easier to clean than the axilla, c) the Musculocutaneous nerve is still within the sheath at this point making this terchnique more consistently useful for upper forearm surgery, and d) a percutaneous indwelling catheter may be placed for postoperative pain control.

== See also ==
- Continuous wound infiltration
- Drug-induced amnesia
- Neuromuscular monitoring
- Suprascapular nerve
