= Chloroprocaine =

Local anesthetic medication

Clinical data
- Trade names: Nesacaine, others
- AHFS/Drugs.com: Hcl: Monograph; Ophthalmic: Multum Consumer Information
- License data: US DailyMed: Chloroprocaine
- Routes of administration: Intrathecal, eye drop
- Drug class: Local anesthetic
- ATC code: N01BA04 (WHO) S01HA08 (WHO)

Legal status
- Legal status: CA: ℞-only; US: ℞-only; Rx-only

Identifiers
- IUPAC name: 2-diethylaminoethyl-4-amino-2-chloro-benzoate
- CAS Number: 133-16-4; 3858-89-7
- PubChem CID: 8612; 441348
- IUPHAR/BPS: 7145
- DrugBank: DB01161; DBSALT000823
- ChemSpider: 8293
- UNII: 5YVB0POT2H; LT7Z1YW11H
- KEGG: D07678; D00732
- ChEBI: CHEBI:3636; CHEBI:3637
- ChEMBL: ChEMBL1179047; ChEMBL944
- CompTox Dashboard (EPA): DTXSID8022799

Chemical and physical data
- Formula: C_{13}H_{19}ClN_{2}O_{2}
- Molar mass: 270.76 g·mol^{−1}
- 3D model (JSmol): Interactive image; Interactive image
- SMILES: CCN(CC)CCOC(=O)C1=C(Cl)C=C(N)C=C1; Cl.CCN(CC)CCOC(=O)C1=C(Cl)C=C(N)C=C1
- InChI: InChI=1S/C13H19ClN2O2/c1-3-16(4-2)7-8-18-13(17)11-6-5-10(15)9-12(11)14/h5-6,9H,3-4,7-8,15H2,1-2H3; Key:VDANGULDQQJODZ-UHFFFAOYSA-N; InChI=1S/C13H19ClN2O2.ClH/c1-3-16(4-2)7-8-18-13(17)11-6-5-10(15)9-12(11)14;/h5-6,9H,3-4,7-8,15H2,1-2H3;1H; Key:SZKQYDBPUCZLRX-UHFFFAOYSA-N

Chloroprocaine, sold under the brand name Nesacaine among others is a local anesthetic given by injection. It is used as the hydrochloride salt. Chloroprocaine is a local anesthetic.

== Medical uses ==
Chloroprocaine (Nesacaine) is indicated for the production of local anesthesia by infiltration and peripheral nerve block; and for the production of local anesthesia by infiltration, peripheral and central nerve block, including lumbar and caudal epidural blocks.

Chloroprocaine (Clorotekal) is indicated for intrathecal injection in adults for the production of subarachnoid block (spinal anesthesia).

Chloroprocaine is used for regional anesthesia including spinal anesthesia, caudal anesthesia and epidural anesthesia.

It is also indicated for local anesthesia including brachial plexus block, cervical nerve block, occipital nerve block. mandibular nerve block or maxillary nerve block for dental anesthesia, ophthalmic anesthesia via infraorbital nerve block, ulnar nerve block, paravertebral block, intercostal nerve block, sciatic nerve block, stellate ganglion block, lumbar sympathetic block and interdigital block.

It is also used for obstetric anesthesia including pudendal nerve block and paracervical block.

Chloroprocaine (Iheezo) is indicated for ocular surface anesthesia.

== Subarachnoid block ==
Chloroprocaine was developed to meet the need for a short-acting spinal anaesthetic that is reliable and has a favourable safety profile to support the growing need for day-case surgery. Licensed in Europe for surgical procedures up to 40 minutes, chloroprocaine is an ester-type local anaesthetic with the shortest duration of action of all the established local anaesthetics. It has a significantly shorter duration of action than lidocaine and is significantly less toxic. Chloroprocaine has a motor block lasting for 40 minutes, a rapid onset time of 3–5 minutes (9.6 min ± 7.3 min at 40 mg dose; 7.9 min ± 6.0 min at 50 mg dose) and a time to ambulation of 90 minutes without complications, especially lacking transient neurologic symptomatology.

These data are based upon a retrospective review of 672 patients suitable for spinal anesthesia in surgical procedures less than 60 minutes' duration using 30–40 mg chloroprocaine. The results showed good surgical anesthesia, a fast onset time, and postoperative mobilization after 90 minutes without complications.

The use of chloroprocaine in the subarachnoid space has been questioned. In the early 1980s, several cases were reported of neurological deficits after inadvertent intrathecal injections intended for epidural delivery. These doses were an order of magnitude higher than is currently used for intrathecal delivery. It is also thought that these deficits were also related to the preservative sodium bisulfite, although this is also controversial.

Some studies have been published on the safe use of intrathecal chloroprocaine when appropriate dosage is used and with preservative-free preparations.

It is approved for intrathecal use in the United States, Europe, and Canada.

== Obstetrics ==
Amide-linked local anesthetic agents, such as lidocaine and bupivacaine, can become "trapped" in their ionized forms on the fetal side of the placenta, so their net transfer across the placenta is increased. An ester-linked local anesthetic agent, such as 2-chloroprocaine, is rapidly metabolized, and placental transfer is limited. Since the metabolism of 2-chloroprocaine by fetal plasma is slower than in maternal plasma, the potential for ion trapping exists. Fetal pH is slightly lower than maternal (7.32 to 7.38), thus most unionized drugs are "ion trapped" to a degree, even in a healthy fetus. Chloroprocaine (pKa 8.7) is the drug of choice for epidural analgesia and a decompensating fetus, because it does not participate in ion trapping. Placental transfer of 2-chloroprocaine is not influenced by fetal acidosis.

The in vitro half-life of chloroprocaine is 21 seconds for maternal and 43 seconds for fetal blood. In patients who are homozygous atypical for plasma cholinesterase, chloroprocaine typically exists for two minutes in circulation.

== Synthesis ==
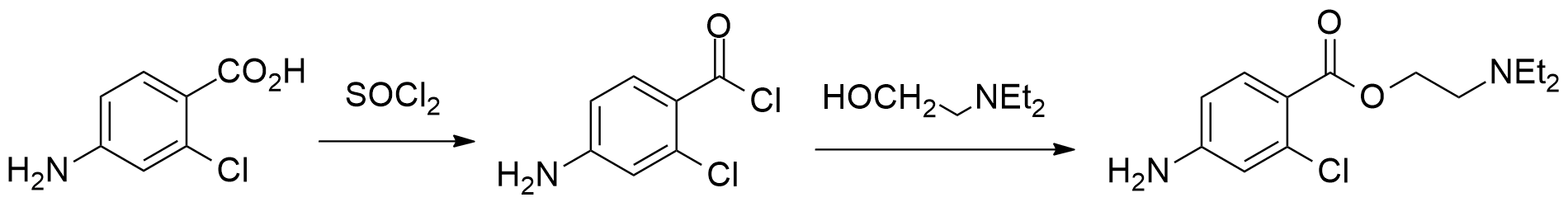
Chloroprocaine synthesis: H.C. Marks, H.I. Rubin, U.S. patent 2,460,139 (1949 to Wallace & Tiernan Inc).

The hydrochloride salt of 4-amino-2-chlorobenzoyl chloride is made by the reaction of 2-chloro-4-aminobenzoic acid with thionyl chloride. Synthesis of this drug is then accomplished by directly reacting the product of the last step with the hydrochloride salt of 2-diethylaminoethanol.
