= Ambesh maneuver =

Ambesh maneuver is a technique that involves the simple external compression of internal jugular vein in the supraclavicular fossa to prevent and diagnose misplacement of the subclavian vein catheter into the internal jugular vein (IJV).

== Indications ==
Catheter placement in one of the big veins (subclavian vein, internal jugular vein or femoral vein) is routinely done to monitor central venous pressure (CVP), to administer long term intravenous medication and parenteral nutrition in critically sick patients. The subclavian vein is the preferred choice for this purpose because it is most comfortable to the patient and has less chances of infection. However, there is a significant risk of misplacement of subclavian vein catheter into the internal jugular vein of same side. Misplaced catheter enhances the risk of clot formation, thrombophlebitis, catheter erosion and inappropriate delivery of drugs in addition to erroneous CVP value. Chest radiograph is performed to identify misplacement, however, it is time-consuming, requires exposure to radiation and may not be feasible in emergency situations.

== Maneuver ==
Ambesh maneuver not only prevents misplacement of subclavian vein catheter into the IJV but also provides instant diagnosis of misplaced catheter. Following successful puncture of subclavian vein with a cannula/needle, same side of IJV is compressed externally by placing a sterile finger in supraclavicular fossa. The guidewire is threaded through the cannula into the subclavian vein keeping the compression on. If the operator notices resistance while inserting the guidewire, it means the guidewire is going north into the IJV. The guidewire is removed gently and re-threaded maintaining the pressure in the supraclavicular fossa. After successful insertion of the guidewire, pressure in fossa is released and the subclavian vein catheter is railroaded over the guidewire up to the desired length. The guidewire is removed and the catheter is now connected to the transducer and the monitor. The CVP waveform pattern as well as its value is noted. The ipsilateral supraclavicular fossa is compressed again and any change in CVP value and/or its waveform pattern is noted. If the waveform pattern is lost (becomes straight line) and or CVP value increased by more than 2 cm H_{2}O then it is surely a misplaced subclavian vein catheter into the same side IJV. If no change occurs then this catheter is fine and can be used for CVP monitoring and drug administration. The Ambesh maneuver is quite simple, handy, inexpensive, and instant bedside technique that prevents and diagnoses misplacement of subclavian vein catheter into the IJV The maneuver is now routinely used and recommended by others to avoid the most common misplacement of subclavian vein catheter.
