= Peripheral nerve stimulation =

Peripheral nerve stimulation may refer to:

- Occipital nerve stimulation
- A type of electroanalgesia
