= Occipital neuritis =

Occipital neuritis may refer to:

- Whiplash injury, or post-traumatic neck extension injuries
- Occipital neuralgia
