= Femoral nerve block =

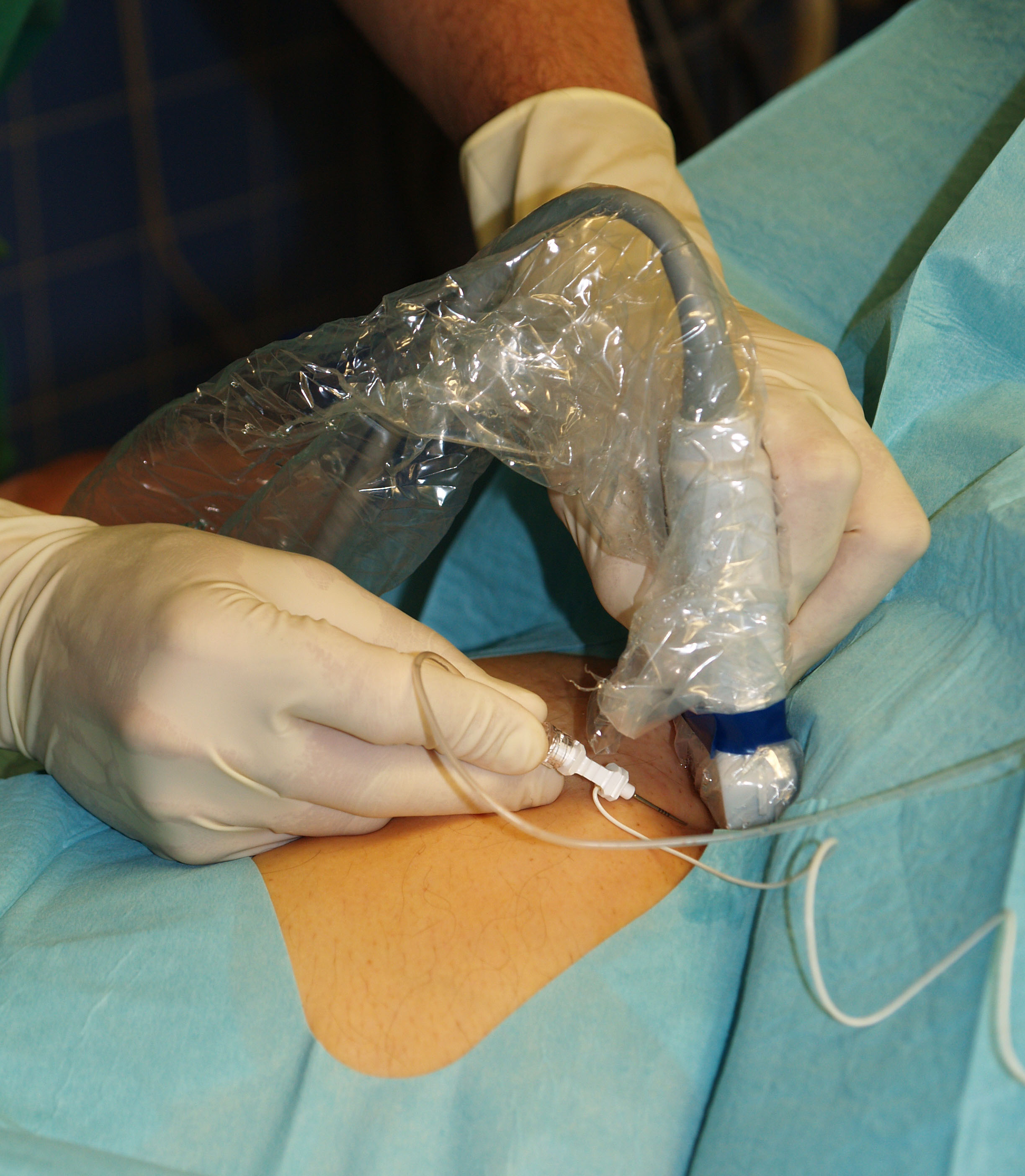
- Ultrasound guided femoral nerve block
- Other names: Femoral block

A femoral nerve block is a nerve block that uses local anesthetic to achieve analgesia in the leg. The block works by affecting the femoral nerve.

A femoral nerve block (FNB) results in anesthesia of the skin and muscles of the anterior thigh and most of the femur and knee joint, as well as the skin on the medial aspect of the leg below the knee joint.

The block can be performed using anatomical landmarks, ultrasound or a nerve stimulator.

For hip surgery, a femoral nerve block and fascia iliac block (FIB) are alternative methods for providing analgesic relief. A meta-analysis concluded that compared to FIB, the FNB decreased visual analog scale at 24 hrs and the incidence of nausea, vomiting and oversedation.

For knee surgery, a femoral nerve block may lead to delayed postoperative mobilization of the patient and greater risk of falls as it causes motor blockade of the quadriceps muscles. Due to the sparing of the thigh muscles, the adductor canal block has become a preferred choice for providing post-operative analgesia for knee surgery.

== See also ==
- Fascia iliaca block
