= Fascia iliaca block =

Regional anesthesia technique

- Other names: fascia iliaca nerve blockade, fascia iliaca compartment blockade, femoral intercutaneal nerve blockade

Fascia iliaca blocks (FIC, FICB) is a local anesthetic nerve block, a type of regional anesthesia technique, used to provide analgesia or anaesthesia to the hip and thigh. FICB can performed by using ultrasound or with a loss of resistance technique, the latter sometimes referred to as the "two-pop-method". FICB works by affecting the femoral, obturator and the lateral cutaneous nerves with a local anesthetic.

== Technique ==
When FICB is performed with the loss of resistance technique, the injection site for FICB is found by drawing an imaginary line between the pubic tubercle to the anterior superior iliac spine. The injection site is 1 cm. below the lateral one third and the medial two thirds of this line. Two losses of resistances are felt as the fascia lata and the fascia iliaca is penetrated by a semi-blunt cannula. Aspiration (drawing back the cannula) is performed, after which a local anaesthetic is injected while compressing on the skin distally to increase cranial distribution. FICB can generally be performed with minimally required training and by non-medical practitioners

== Medical uses ==
FIC can be used to offer pain relief for hip fractures in adults and femoral fractures in children.

== Adverse effects ==
FIC is generally safe to use and have few adverse effects. There is a 0.09-3.2% risk of hematomas at the injection site and a 0.18% risk of local anaesthetic intoxication. There are also case reports of pneumoretroperitoneum using continuous infusion, bladder puncture with a modified block under very special conditions and postoperative neuropathy.

== History ==
The block was first described in 1989 as an alternative to 3-in-1 nerve block in children.

== See also ==
- Femoral nerve block
- Lidocaine
