= Infraclavicular fossa =

Indentation in the clavicle (collarbone)

Infraclavicular fossa (Mohrenheim's fossa)
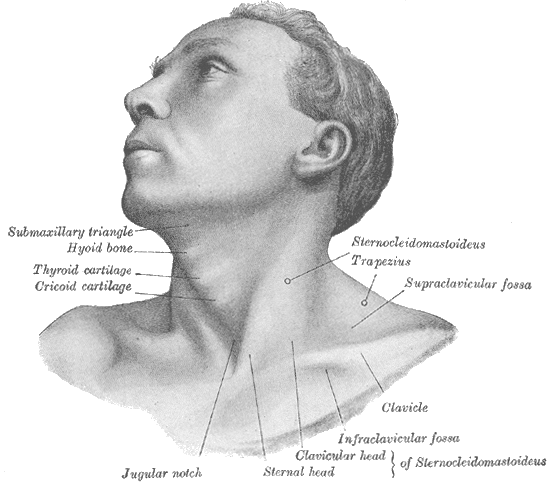
- Anterolateral view of head and neck (infraclavicular fossa labeled at bottom right)

Details

Identifiers
- Latin: fossa infraclavicularis
- TA98: A01.2.03.003
- TA2: 248
- FMA: 61541

The Infraclavicular fossa is an indentation, or fossa, immediately below the clavicle, above the third rib and between the deltoid muscle laterally and medioclavicular line medially.

== See also ==
- Supraclavicular fossa
