= Sciatic nerve block =

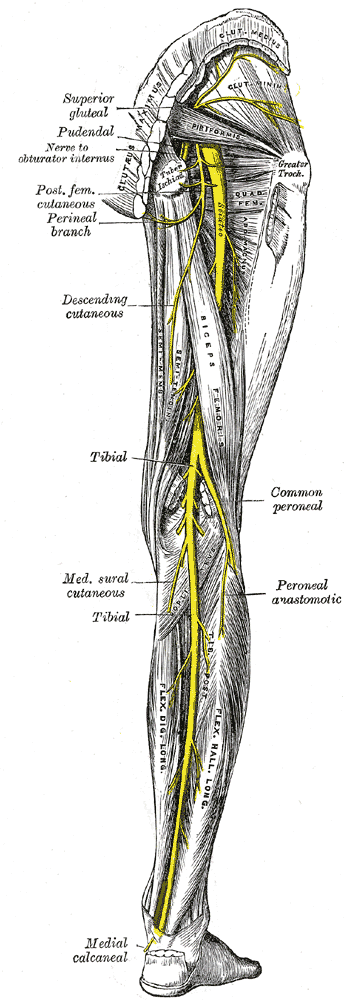
- Nerves of the right lower extremity Posterior view

A sciatic nerve block is a nerve block that uses local anesthetic to achieve analgesia in the leg. The block works by affecting the sciatic nerve and is used for surgeries at or below the knee.

The sciatic nerve is located in the gluteus maximus muscle, where the block is performed. The sciatic nerve can be blocked at different locations. At the popliteal fossa, the sciatic nerve divides into its two branches: The tibial and the common peroneal nerve. If surgery is performed on the ankle, achilles tendon or foot a popliteal block can be performed, affecting the two branches of the sciatic nerve. It is done above the knee on the posterior leg where the sciatic nerve starts splitting into the common peroneal and tibial nerves.
