= Thoracic spinal nerve 2 =

Spinal nerve of the top of the thorax

Thoracic spinal nerve
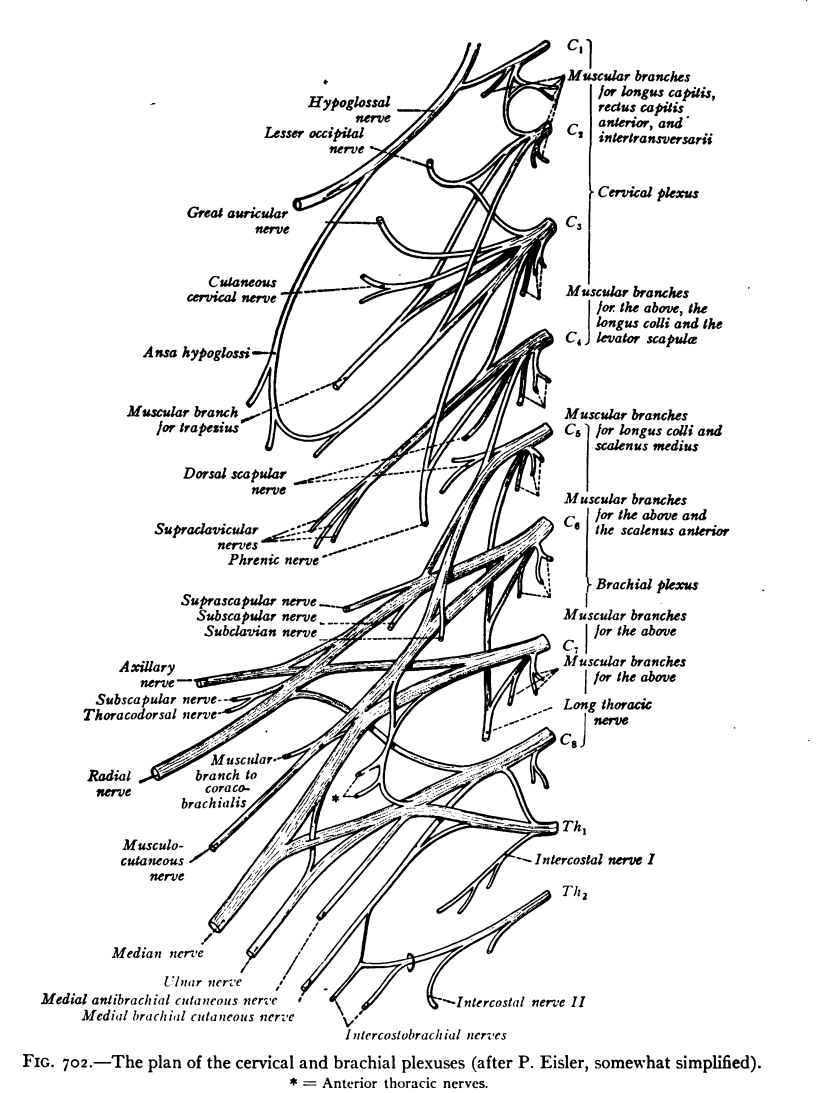
- The plan of the cervical and brachial plexuses.

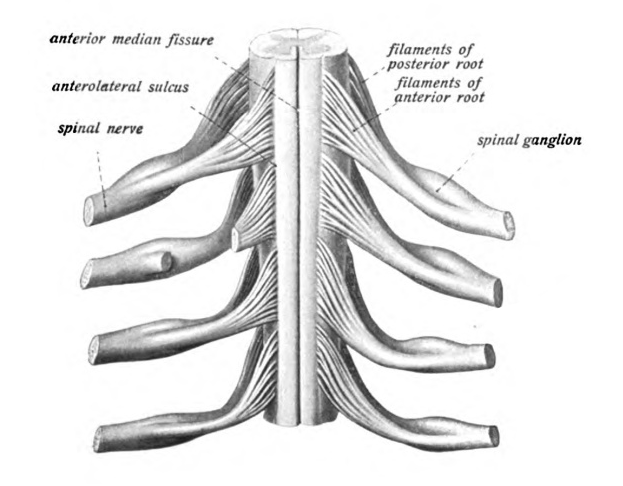
- The spinal cord with spinal nerves.

Details

Identifiers
- Latin: nervi spinalis
- FMA: 6169

The thoracic spinal nerve 2 (T2) is a spinal nerve of the thoracic segment.

It originates from the spinal column from below the thoracic vertebra 2 (T2).
