= Cervical artery =

Cervical artery may refer to:

- Ascending cervical artery
- Deep cervical artery
- Transverse cervical artery
