= Nerve block =

Deliberate inhibition of nerve impulses

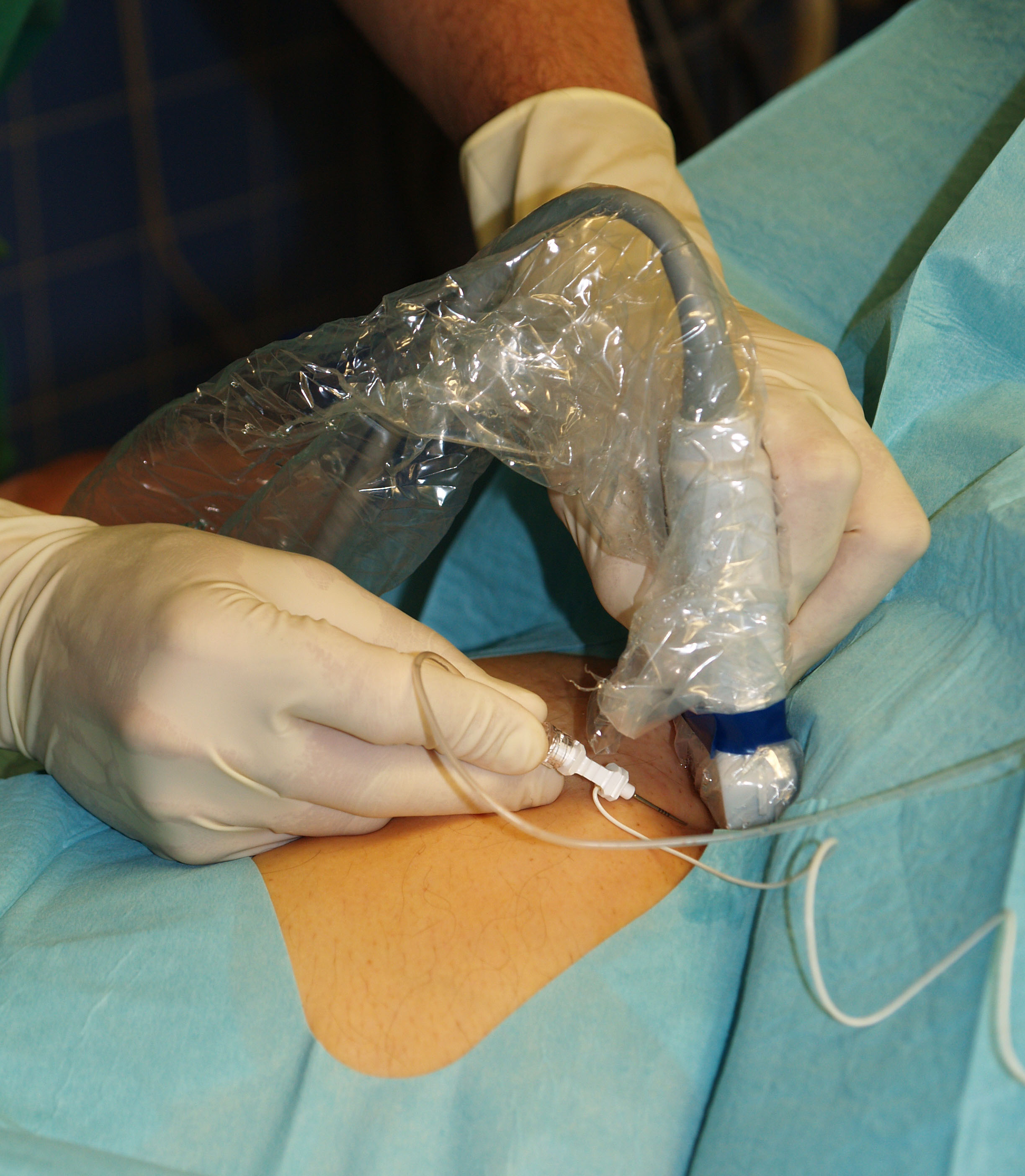
- Ultrasound guided femoral nerve block
- ICD-9-CM: 04.81
- MeSH: D009407

Nerve block or regional nerve blockade is any deliberate interruption of signals traveling along a nerve, often for the purpose of pain relief. Local anesthetic nerve block (sometimes referred to as simply "nerve block") is a short-term block, usually lasting hours or days, involving the injection of an anesthetic, a corticosteroid, and other agents onto or near a nerve. Neurolytic block, the deliberate temporary degeneration of nerve fibers through the application of chemicals, heat, or freezing, produces a block that may persist for weeks, months, or indefinitely. Neurectomy, the cutting through or removal of a nerve or a section of a nerve, usually produces a permanent block. Because neurectomy of a sensory nerve is often followed, months later, by the emergence of new, more intense pain, sensory nerve neurectomy is rarely performed.

The concept of nerve block sometimes includes central nerve block, which includes epidural and spinal anaesthesia.

== Local anesthetic nerve block ==
Local anesthetic nerve block (local anesthetic regional nerve blockade, or often simply nerve block) is a short-term nerve block involving the injection of local anesthetic as close to the nerve as possible for pain relief. The local anesthetic bathes the nerve and numbs the area of the body that is supplied by that nerve. The goal of the nerve block is to prevent pain by blocking the transmission of pain signals from the affected area. Local anesthetic is often combined with other drugs to potentiate or prolong the analgesia produced by the nerve block. These adjuvants may include epinephrine (or more specific alpha-adrenergic agonists), corticosteroids, opioids, or ketamine. These blocks can be either single treatments, multiple injections over a period of time, or continuous infusions. A continuous peripheral nerve block can be introduced into a limb undergoing surgery – for example, a femoral nerve block to prevent pain in knee replacement.

=== Uses ===
==== Regional analgesia ====
Regional blocks can be used for procedural anesthesia, post-operative analgesia, and treatment of acute pain in the emergency room. Consequently they can be an alternative to general anesthesia as well as oral pain medications. An advantage over oral pain medications is that regional blocks can provide complete relief of pain along a nerve distribution. This can lead to a reduction in the amount of opiates needed. Advantages over general anesthesia include faster recovery and less need for monitoring.

==== Diagnostic blocks ====
Nerve blocks can be used for the diagnosis of surgically treatable chronic pain, such as nerve compression syndrome. Advances in surgical techniques such as minimally invasive surgery have made virtually all peripheral nerves surgically accessible since the invention of open surgery. Any nerve that can be blocked can now be treated with a nerve decompression. Imaging such as MRI has poor correlation with clinical diagnosis of nerve entrapment as well as intraoperative findings of decompression surgeries and so diagnostic blocks are used for surgical planning.

=== Technique ===
Local anesthetic nerve blocks are sterile procedures usually performed in an outpatient facility or hospital. The procedure can be performed with the help of ultrasound, fluoroscopy, CT, or MRI/MRN to guide the practitioner in the placement of the needle. The various imaging modalities differ in their availability, cost, spatial resolution, soft tissue resolution, bone resolution, radiation exposure, accuracy, real-time imaging capabilities, and ability to visualize small or deep nerves.

==== Landmark-guided peripheral nerve block ====
Landmark-guided (or "blind") nerve blocks use palpable anatomical landmarks and a working knowledge of the superficial and deep anatomy to determine where to place the needle. Although a peripheral nerve stimulator can be used to facilitate placement of the block, it is designed to elicit a motor response rather than creating a paresthesia, making it less effective for identifying purely sensory nerves. Landmark-guided injections have largely been replaced with image guidance due to increased accuracy, but there are some nerves for which landmark-guidance still has comparable accuracy, such as the pudendal nerve.

==== Fluoroscopy-guided peripheral nerve block ====
Fluoroscopy is an imaging technique that uses X-rays to obtain real-time moving planar images of the interior of an object. In this sense, fluoroscopy is a continuous x-ray. Fluoroscopy is broadly similar to landmark-guided injections except that the landmarks are based on radiographic anatomy. However, there is poor soft tissue contrast, meaning that nerves cannot be clearly visualized. Nerves that are situated by bony landmarks can be good candidates, such as epidural steroid injections, which target the spinal nerves.

The radiation involved is higher than an x-ray, but lower than a CT-guided injection (which is itself lower than a full CT scan). One study found about 0.40 mSv exposure per minute of fluoroscopy for up to 3 minutes and another found that 3711 epidural injections took a maximum of 47 seconds.

==== Ultrasound-guided peripheral nerve block ====
Ultrasound-guided peripheral nerve block is a procedure that allows real-time imaging of the positions of the targeted nerve, needle, and surrounding vasculature and other anatomical structures. This visual aid increases the success rate of the block and may reduce the risk of complications. It may also reduce the amount of local anesthetic required, while reducing the onset time of blocks. Ultrasound has also resulted in an exponential rise in fascial plane blocks. Ultrasound is particularly well-suited for regional anesthesia, since many of the anesthesia targets (e.g., brachial plexus, femoral nerve) have large blood vessels that travel with the target nerves. Direct visualization of nerves is not just important for localization, but also to ensure that the injected material surrounds the nerve. Likewise, visualization of blood vessels is important to ensure that needle placement avoids blood vessels, which often travel directly parallel to nerves.

Ultrasound machine is generally portable and inexpensive in comparison to the CT scanner, fluoroscopic machine, and MRI scanner. The relatively low cost of an ultrasound machine compared to other imaging machines allows for its widespread availability.

Ultrasound has a few limitations. First an acoustic window is required, and certain tissue types such as bone can interfere with image acquisition. Next hand-operated probe can make the images challenging for surgical planning when the exact needle location must be known. CT and MRI have standard slicing orientations (sagittal, coronal, axial), but for ultrasound the orientation of the 2D image depends on the position and orientation of a probe held by the operator. Lastly ultrasound has a tradeoff between penetration depth and resolution. Higher frequencies provide better resolution but have less penetration depth. You may be able to acquire good resolution at shallow depths or see deep structures only with poor resolution. The limited penetration depth and resolution tends to make ultrasound a poor choice in particular for deeply situated pelvic nerves.

==== CT-guided peripheral nerve block ====
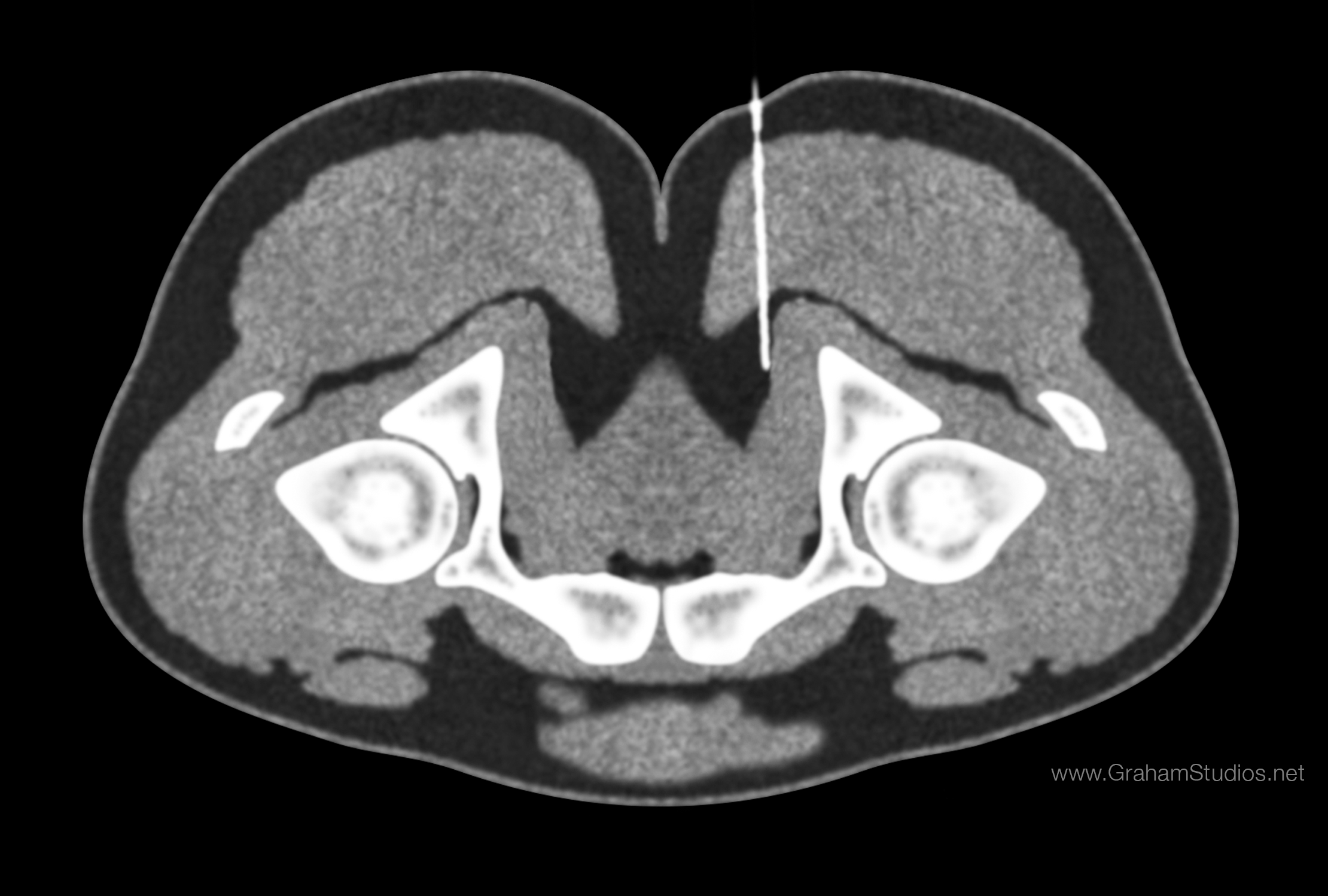
Illustration of a CT-guided nerve block. The needle tip has been placed at top of the pudendal canal to block the pudendal nerve.

The use of CT guidance is largely predicated on the limitations of lower cost image-guided injections such as fluoroscopy and ultrasound, as well as the cost considerations and availability of more precise imaging such as MRI-guidance.

CT provides excellent spatial resolution and good soft-tissue contrast. This makes it easy to verify the anatomic level. While the use of CT does expose the patient to radiation, the amount of radiation is less than a full scan. For example, the radiation from a lumbar spine CT is approximately 7.5 mSv, but the radiation from standard protocols for CT-guided epidurals is about 1.3-1.5 mSv. A low-dose CT protocol may still provide the required resolution, and if used can reduce the radiation exposure by another 85%, bringing the radiation exposure to about 0.2 mSv.

The machine cost of CT is a barrier to availability and more widespread use, though still more cost-effective than an MRI. CT machine costs can range from US$415,000 to US$615,000.

==== MRI-guided peripheral nerve block ====
MRI provides excellent visualization of soft tissues, but the detail is not usually enough to see the small nerves that are often entrapped. Newer technology (MR neurography), however, has increased the level of nerve details seen and allowed for more accurate MRI-directed injections. The ability to visualize nerves is important for localization and also for ensuring that injected material properly surrounds the nerve. The good soft tissue contrast also makes it easier to avoid injuring other tissue structures such as blood vessels and in the case of pelvic injections, the large intestines.

MRN-guided blocks are especially effective for deep, small nerves which are otherwise difficult to visualize with ultrasound and CT. The use of radiation-free MRI complies with ALARP (As Low As Reasonably Practical) practice mandate and can be a better choice for radiation-sensitive patients such as children and pregnant women. However, due to the expense of MRI machines, MRN-guidance is not a substitute for other imaging modalities, but rather a specialized tool which higher accuracy is required. The cost of an MRI machine limits more widespread use and is significant, at about $1,000,000 USD per Tesla. Often a 1.5T machine with a wide bore will be used, but a 3T machine should provide the highest resolution.

=== Common local anesthetics ===
Aminoesters and aminoamides. There is an aromatic lipophilic portion connected to an intermediate chain and amine hydrophilic portion.

Local anesthetics are broken down into two categories: ester-linked and amide-linked. The esters include benzocaine, procaine, tetracaine, and chloroprocaine. The amides include lidocaine, mepivacaine, prilocaine, bupivacaine, ropivacaine, and levobupivacaine. Chloroprocaine is a short-acting drug (45–90 minutes), lidocaine and mepivacaine are intermediate duration (90–180 minutes), and bupivacaine, levobupivacaine, and ropivacaine are long-acting (4–18 hours). Drugs commonly used for peripheral nerve blocks include lidocaine, ropivacaine, bupivacaine, and mepivacaine.

=== Mechanism of action ===
Local anesthetics act on the voltage-gated sodium channels that conduct electrical impulses and mediate fast depolarization along nerves. Local anesthetics also act on potassium channels, but they block sodium channels more.

Lidocaine preferentially binds to the inactivated state of voltage-gated sodium channels, but has also been found to bind potassium channels, G protein-coupled receptors, NMDA receptors, and calcium channels in vitro. The duration of the block is mostly influenced by the amount of time the anesthetic is near the nerve. Lipid solubility, blood flow in the tissue, and presence of vasoconstrictors with the anesthetic all play a role in this. A higher lipid solubility makes the anesthetic more potent and have a longer duration of action; however, it also increases the toxicity of the drug.

=== Adjuvants ===
Local anaesthetics are often combined with adjuvants, drugs that boost the effect of each other, with the end goal of increasing the duration of the analgesia or shortening time of onset. Adjuvants may include epinephrine, clonidine, and dexmedetomidine. Vasoconstriction caused by local anesthetic may be further enhanced synergistically with the addition of epinephrine, the most widely used additive. Epinephrine increases the length of analgesic duration and decreases blood flow by acting as an agonist at the α1-adrenoceptor. Dexmedetomidine is not as widely used as epinephrine. Studies in humans indicate improved onset time and increased duration of analgesia.

It is unclear if the use of epinephrine in addition to lidocaine is safe for nerve blocks of fingers and toes due to insufficient evidence. Another 2015 review states that it is safe in those who are otherwise healthy. The addition of dexamethasone to a nerve block or if given intravenously for surgery can prolong the duration of an upper limb nerve block leading to reduction in postoperative opioid consumption.

=== Duration of action ===
The duration of the nerve block depends on the type of local anesthetics used and the amount injected around the target nerve. There are short acting (45–90 minutes), intermediate duration (90–180 minutes), and long acting anesthetics (4–18 hours). Block duration can be prolonged with use of a vasoconstrictor such as epinephrine, which decreases the diffusion of the anesthetic away from the nerve.

There are various types of nerve blocks currently performed. Therapeutic blocks may be used for acute pain patients, diagnostic blocks are used to find pain sources, prognostic blocks are used to determine subsequent pain management options, preemptive blocks minimize postoperative pain, and some blocks can be used in place of surgery. Certain surgeries may benefit from placing a catheter that stays in place for 2–3 days postoperatively. Catheters are indicated for some surgeries where the expected postoperative pain lasts longer than 15–20 hours. Pain medication can be injected through the catheter to prevent a spike in pain when the initial block wears off. Nerve blocks may also reduce the risk of developing persistent postoperative pain several months after surgery.

Local anesthetic nerve blocks are sterile procedures that can be performed with the help of anatomical landmarks, ultrasound, fluoroscopy (a live X-ray), or CT. Use of any one of these imaging modalities enables the physician to view the placement of the needle. Electrical stimulation can also provide feedback on the proximity of the needle to the target nerve.

=== Complications ===
Complications of nerve blocks most commonly include infection, bleeding, and block failure. Nerve injury is a rare side effect occurring roughly 0.03–0.2% of the time.

Regarding block failure, patients can differ in their local response to anesthetic and resistance is an under-recognized cause of injection failure. In 2003, Trescot interviewed 1198 consecutive patients; 250 patients noted failure of relief from an injection of bupivacaine or had a history of difficulty getting numb at the dentist. Skin testing with lidocaine, bupivacaine, and mepivacaine was performed to identify the most effective local anesthetic (i.e. the local anesthetic that caused the most skin numbness). Ninety of those patients (7.5% of the total patients, but 36% of the test group) were numb only to mepivacaine, and an additional 43 patients (3.8% of the total patients, but 17% of the test group) only got numb to lidocaine. Thus, 133 of 250 patients with a history of difficulty with local anesthetic analgesia (53%) and 11% of the total patients, did not get numb with bupivacaine (the most commonly used anesthetic), suggesting a significant potential false-negative response to diagnostic injections.

Local anesthetic toxicity, the most dangerous complication, is often first detected by symptoms of numbness and tingling around the mouth, metallic taste, or ringing in the ears. Additionally, it may lead to seizures, arrhythmias, and may progress to cardiac arrest. This reaction may stem from an allergy, excessive dose, or intravascular injection. Local anesthetic systemic toxicity (LAST) can include neurologic and cardiovascular symptoms including cardiovascular collapse and death. Other side effects can result from the specific medications used; for example, transient tachycardia may result if epinephrine is administered in the block. Despite these possible complications, procedures done under regional anesthesia (nerve block with or without intravenous sedation) carry a lower anesthetic risk than general anesthesia.

Other complications include nerve injury which has an extremely low rate of 0.029–0.2%. Some research even suggests that ultrasound lowers the risk to 0.0037%. The use of ultrasound and nerve stimulation has greatly improved practitioners' ability to safely administer nerve blocks. Nerve injury most often occurs from ischaemia, compression, direct neurotoxicity, needle laceration, and inflammation.

== Neurolytic block ==
A neurolytic block can be:

- A form of nerve block involving the deliberate injury of a nerve by freezing or heating ("neurotomy").
- Application of chemicals as alcohol or phenol in glycerin ("neurolysis"). These interventions cause degeneration of the nerve's fibers and temporary (a few months, usually) interference with the transmission of nerve signals. In these procedures, the thin protective layer around the nerve fiber, the basal lamina, is preserved so that, as a damaged fiber regrows, it travels within its basal lamina tube and connects with the correct loose end, and function may be restored.
- Surgical cutting of a nerve (neurectomy), severs these basal lamina tubes, and without them to channel the regrowing fibers to their lost connections, over time a painful neuroma or deafferentation pain may develop. This is why the neurolytic is usually preferred over the surgical block.

The neurolytic block is sometimes used to temporarily reduce or eliminate pain in part of the body. Targets include

- the celiac plexus, most commonly for cancer of the gastrointestinal tract up to the transverse colon, and pancreatic cancer, but also for stomach cancer, gall bladder cancer, adrenal mass, common bile duct cancer, chronic pancreatitis and active intermittent porphyria
- the splanchnic nerve, for retroperitoneal pain, and similar conditions to those addressed by the celiac plexus block but, because of its higher rate of complications, used only if the celiac plexus block is not producing adequate relief
- the hypogastric plexus, for cancer affecting the descending colon, sigmoid colon and rectum, as well as cancers of the bladder, prostatic urethra, prostate, seminal vesicles, testicles, uterus, ovary and vaginal fundus
- the ganglion impar, for the perineum, vulva, anus, distal rectum, distal urethra, and distal third of the vagina
- the stellate ganglion, usually for head and neck cancer, or sympathetically mediated arm and hand pain
- the triangle of auscultation for pain from rib fractures and post thoracotomy using a rhomboid intercostal block
- the intercostal nerves, which serve the skin of the chest and abdomen
- and a dorsal root ganglion may be treated by targeting the root inside the subarachnoid cavity, most effective for pain in the chest or abdominal wall, but also used for other areas including arm/hand or leg/foot pain.

== Neurectomy ==
Neurectomy is a surgical procedure in which a nerve or section of a nerve is severed or removed. Cutting a sensory nerve severs its basal lamina tubes, and without them to channel the regrowing fibers to their lost connections, over time a painful neuroma or deafferentation pain may develop. This is why the neurolytic is usually preferred over the surgical sensory nerve block. This surgery is performed in rare cases of severe chronic pain where no other treatments have been successful, and for other conditions such as involuntary twitching and excessive blushing or sweating.

A brief "rehearsal" local anesthetic nerve block is usually performed before the actual neurectomy to determine efficacy and detect side effects. The patient is typically under general anesthetic during the neurectomy, which is performed by a neurosurgeon.

== Regional blocks ==
=== Upper extremity ===
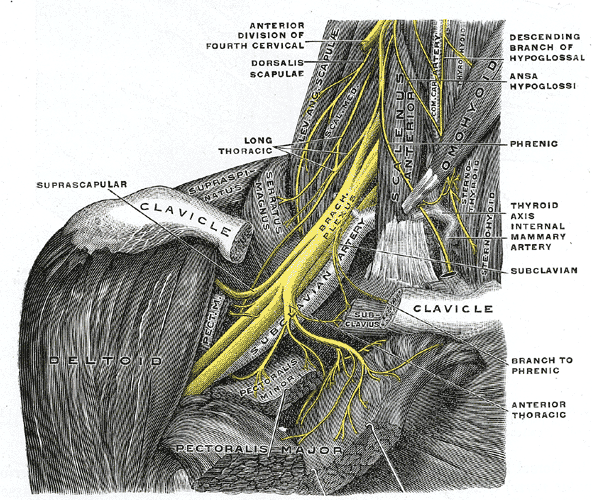
Interscalene brachial plexus

The brachial plexus is a bundle of nerves innervating the shoulder and arm and can be blocked at different levels depending on the type of upper extremity surgery being performed. Interscalene brachial plexus blocks can be done before shoulder, arm, and elbow surgery. The interscalene block is done at the neck where the brachial plexus emerges between the anterior and middle scalene muscles. Lidocaine is injected first to numb the skin and then a blunt needle is used to protect the nerves from damage as the physician places the needle very close to the nerves. The needle goes in about 3–4 cm and a single shot of local anesthetic is injected or a catheter is placed. The most common local anesthetics used at the site of the nerves are bupivicaine, mepivicaine, and chloroprocaine. There is a very high chance that the phrenic nerve, which innervates the diaphragm, will be blocked so this block should only be done on patients who have use of their accessory respiratory muscles. The block may not affect the C8 and T1 roots which supply part of the hand, so it is usually not done for hand surgeries.

The supraclavicular and infraclavicular blocks can be performed for surgeries on the humerus, elbow, and hand. These blocks are indicated for the same surgeries but they provide different views of the nerves, so it depends on the individual patient's anatomy to determine which block should be performed. A pneumothorax is a risk with these blocks, so the pleura should be checked with ultrasound to make sure the lung was not punctured during the block.

The axillary block is indicated for elbow, forearm, and hand surgery. It anesthetizes the median, ulnar, and radial nerves. This block is useful because it has less risk than the interscalene (spinal cord or vertebral artery puncture) or supraclavicular (pneumothorax) brachial plexus blocks.

=== Lower extremity ===
Lumbar plexus innervates the lower extremity.

Fascia iliaca block is indicated for pain relief for hip fractures in adults and femoral fractures in children. It works by affecting the femoral, obturator and the lateral cutaneous nerves.

3-in-1 nerve block is indicated for pain relief for hip fractures.

The femoral nerve block is indicated for femur, anterior thigh, and knee surgery. It is performed slightly inferior to the inguinal ligament, and the nerve is under the fascia iliaca.

The sciatic nerve block is done for surgeries at or below the knee. The nerve is located in the gluteus maximus muscle. The popliteal block is done for ankle, achilles tendon, and foot surgery. It is done above the knee on the posterior leg where the sciatic nerve starts splitting into the common peroneal and tibial nerves.

The saphenous nerve block is often done in combination with the popliteal block for surgeries below the knee. The saphenous nerve is numbed at the medial part of the lower thigh under the sartorius muscle.

The lumbar plexus block is an advanced technique indicated for hip, anterior thigh, and knee surgery. The lumbar plexus is composed of nerves originating from L1 to L4 spinal roots such as the iliohypogastric, ilioinguinal, genitofemoral, lateral femoral cutaneous, femoral, and obturator nerves. Since the plexus is located deep, there is an increased risk of local anesthetic toxicity, so less toxic anesthetics like chloroprocaine or mepivacaine mixed with ropivacaine are often recommended. A curvilinear ultrasound probe can be used but it is often difficult to see the plexus, so a nerve stimulator is used to locate it.

=== Genicular nerve block ===
Temporary anesthesia of genicular (knee) sensory nerves is used as a diagnostic procedure to help determine whether or not a person with chronic severe knee pain may be a candidate for more durable treatment with radiofrequency ablation. Using imaging guidance, needles are placed near branches of the genicular nerves, which are then anesthetized with a short-lasting anesthetic, such as lidocaine. Although selection of the genicular nerve branches or other sensory nerves may vary by clinician experience, blocking the superior lateral, superior medial, and inferior medial genicular nerves has proven successful for reducing knee pain.

Following genicular nerve block, knee pain is monitored over hours to days when the local anesthetic is blocking the knee joint pain. In people who experience a significant alleviation of knee pain with this diagnostic test, radiofrequency ablation of the same genicular nerves can then be performed as a treatment for long-lasting pain relief, which may persist over several months to two years.

=== Paravertebral nerve ===
The paravertebral block is versatile and can be used for various surgeries depending on the vertebral level it is done. A block at the neck in the cervical region is useful for thyroid gland and carotid artery surgery. At the chest and abdomen in the thoracic region, blocks are used for breast, thoracic, and abdominal surgery. One of the first instances on using continuous paravertebral blockade in the body was by the thoracic team led by Sabanathan in Bradford. A block at the hip in the lumbar region is indicated for hip, knee, and anterior thigh surgeries. The paravertebral block provides unilateral analgesia, but bilateral blocks can be performed for abdominal surgeries. Since it is a unilateral block, it may be chosen over epidurals for patients who cannot tolerate the hypotension that follows bilateral sympathectomy. The paravertebral space is located a couple centimeters lateral to the spinous process and is bounded posteriorly by the superior costotransverse ligament and anteriorly by the parietal pleura. Complications include pneumothorax, vascular puncture, hypotension, and pleural puncture.

=== Erector spinae plane block ===
The erector spinae plan block is sometimes suggested for thoracic-related pain control to reduce the need for opioids after surgery. This block can provide pain control for a large part of the hemithorax region. Examples include breast surgery, rib fractures (including posterior fractures), and chest-wall related pain. This block may also be applied at lower levels of the spine (lumbar and sacral levels) to target pelvic abdominal regions of the body that require pain relief. There is also some evidence that this block may be helpful for managing pain in conditions and procedures such as pancreatitis and appendicitis, thoracotomy, hernia repairs (ventral), lumbar fusion surgery, the Nuss procedure (pectus excavatum treatment), kidney stone removal procedures, and minimally invasive chest surgery.
