= Lesser occipital nerve =

Nerve of the head and neck

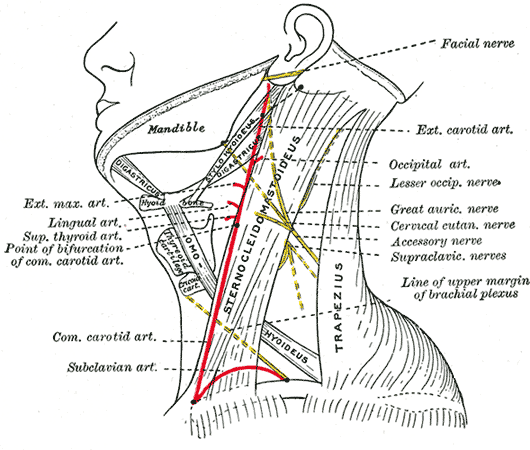
- Side of neck, showing chief surface markings. (Lesser occip. nerve labeled at center right.)

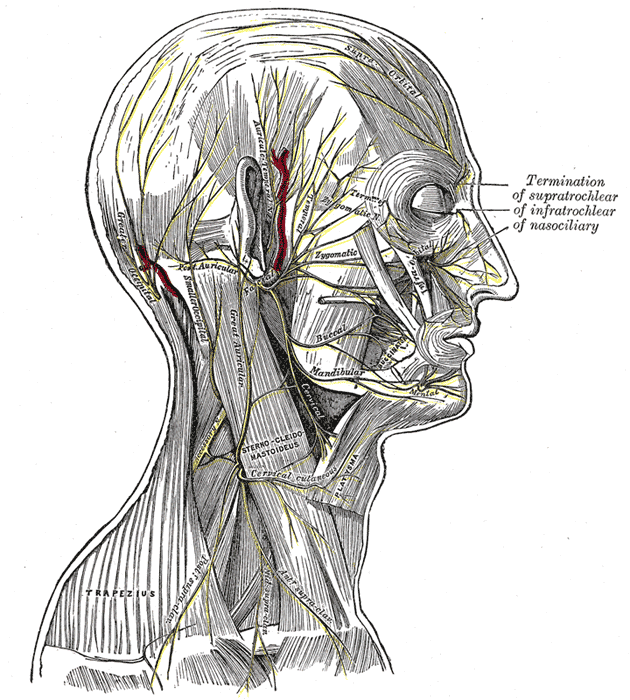
- The nerves of the scalp, face, and side of neck. (Smaller occipital visible below and to the left of the ear.)

Details
- From: Cervical plexus (C2)
- Innervates: Cutaneous innervation of the posterior aspect of the auricle and mastoid region

Identifiers
- Latin: nervus occipitalis minor
- TA98: A14.2.02.017
- TA2: 6384
- FMA: 6871

The lesser occipital nerve (or small occipital nerve) is a cutaneous spinal nerve of the cervical plexus. It arises from second cervical (spinal) nerve (C2) (along with the greater occipital nerve). It innervates the skin of the back of the upper neck and of the scalp posterior to the ear.

== Structure ==
=== Origin ===
It arises from the (lateral branch of the ventral ramus) of cervical spinal nerve C2; it (sources differ) receives or may also receive fibres from cervical spinal nerve C3. It originates between the atlas, and axis.

The lesser occipital nerve is one of the four cutaneous branches of the cervical plexus.

=== Course and relations ===
It curves around the accessory nerve (CN XI) to come to course anterior to it. It then curves around and ascends along the posterior border of the sternocleidomastoid muscle; rarely, it may pierce the muscle. Near the cranium, it perforates the deep cervical fascia. It is continued upwards along the scalp posterior to the auricle. It divides into medial and lateral segments between the inion, and intermastoid line.

=== Branches ===
It has an auricular, a mastoid, and an occipital branch.

Its auricular branch supplies the skin of the upper and back part of the auricula, communicating with the mastoid branch of the great auricular. This branch is occasionally derived from the greater occipital nerve.

=== Distribution ===
The nerve provides sensory innervation to the upper part of the back of the neck and adjacent scalp posterior to the auricle; it may also contribute to the sensory innervation of the auricle itself.

=== Communications ===
It communicates with the greater occipital nerve, great auricular nerve, and the auricular branch of the facial nerve.

=== Variation ===
Rarely, the lesser occipital nerve may be duplicated or triplicated.

== Clinical significance ==
Problems with the lesser occipital nerve cause occipital neuralgia. Nerve block is difficult due to variation in the course of the nerve.

== Additional images ==
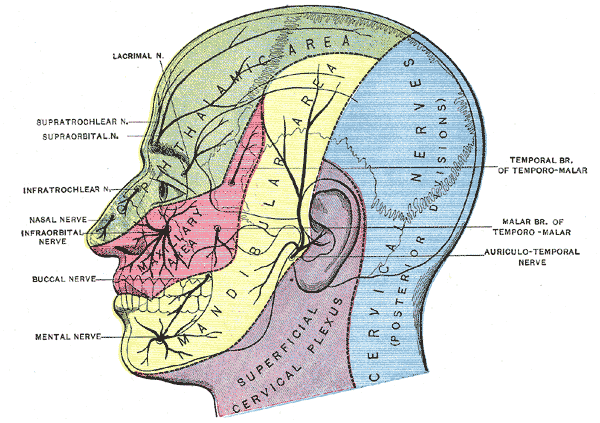
Dermatome distribution of the trigeminal nerve
