= Third occipital nerve =

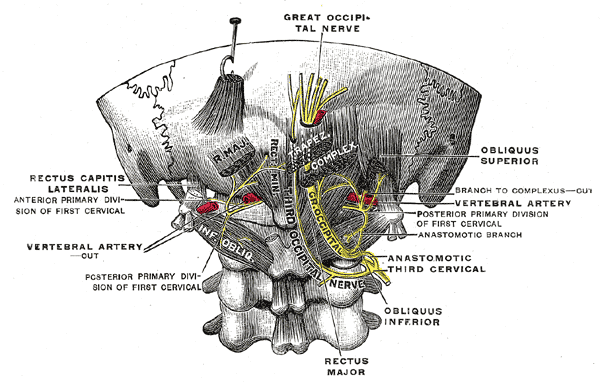
- Posterior primary divisions of the upper three cervical nerves. (Third occipital nerve visible at center.)

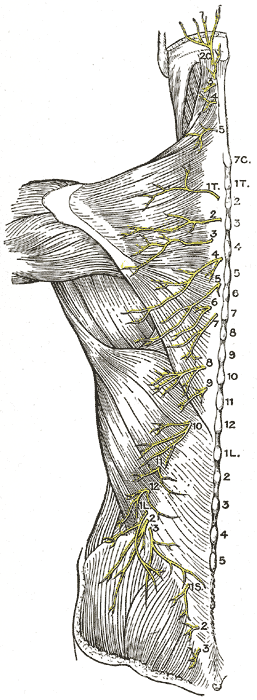
- Diagram of the distribution of the cutaneous branches of the posterior divisions of the spinal nerves. (Third cervical labeled at top.)

Details
- From: C3

Identifiers
- Latin: nervus occipitalis tertius
- TA98: A14.2.02.009
- TA2: 6367
- FMA: 65608

While under the trapezius, the medial branch of the posterior division of the third cervical nerve gives off a branch called the third occipital nerve (also known as the least occipital nerve), which pierces the Trapezius and ends in the skin of the lower part of the back of the head.

It lies medial to the greater occipital nerve and communicates with it.

== Additional images ==
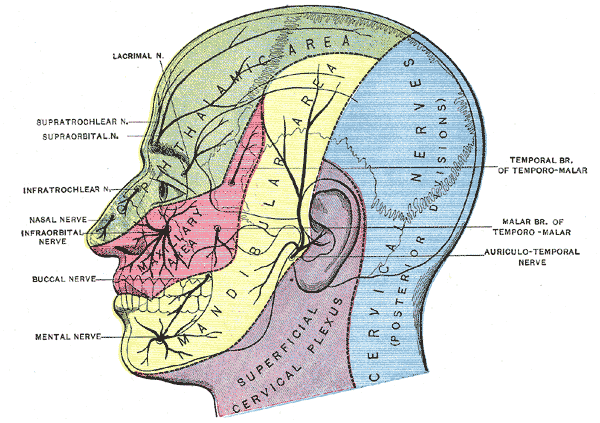
Dermatome distribution of the trigeminal nerve
