= Supraclavicular fossa =

Human body area

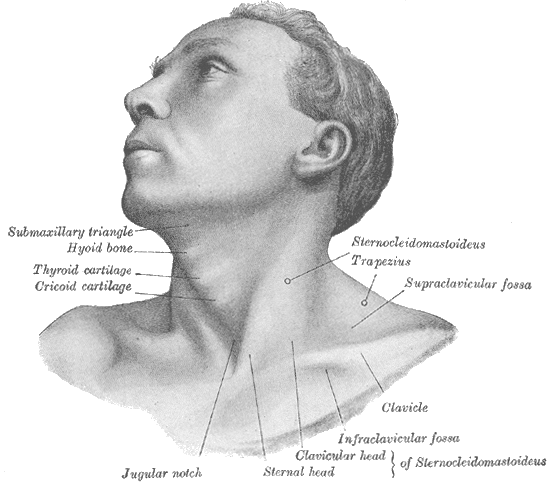
- Anterolateral view of head and neck (supraclavicular fossa labeled at center right)

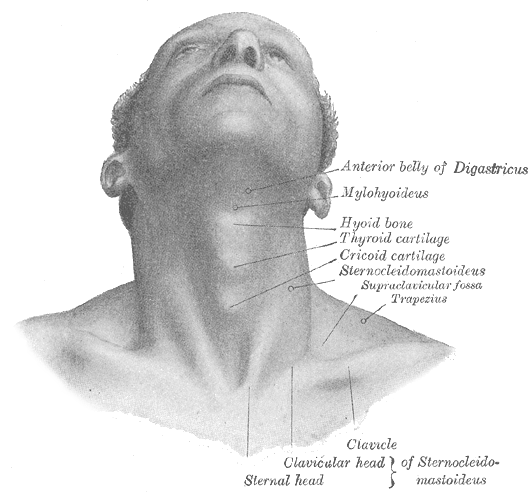
- Front view of neck (supraclavicular fossa labeled at center right)

Details

Identifiers
- Latin: fossa supraclavicularis
- TA98: A01.2.02.011; A01.2.02.008
- TA2: 238, 240

The supraclavicular fossa is an indentation (fossa) immediately above the clavicle.

In terminologia anatomica, it is divided into fossa supraclavicularis major and fossa supraclavicularis minor

Fullness in the supraclavicular fossa can be a sign of upper extremity deep venous thrombosis.

== Additional images ==
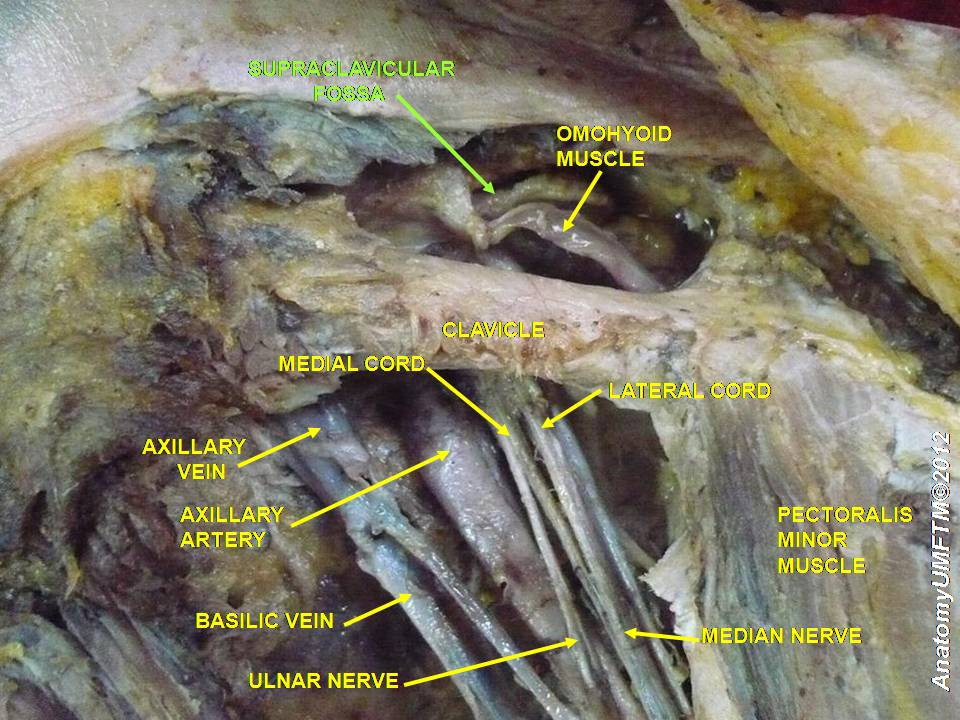
Dissection of the supraclavicular fossa

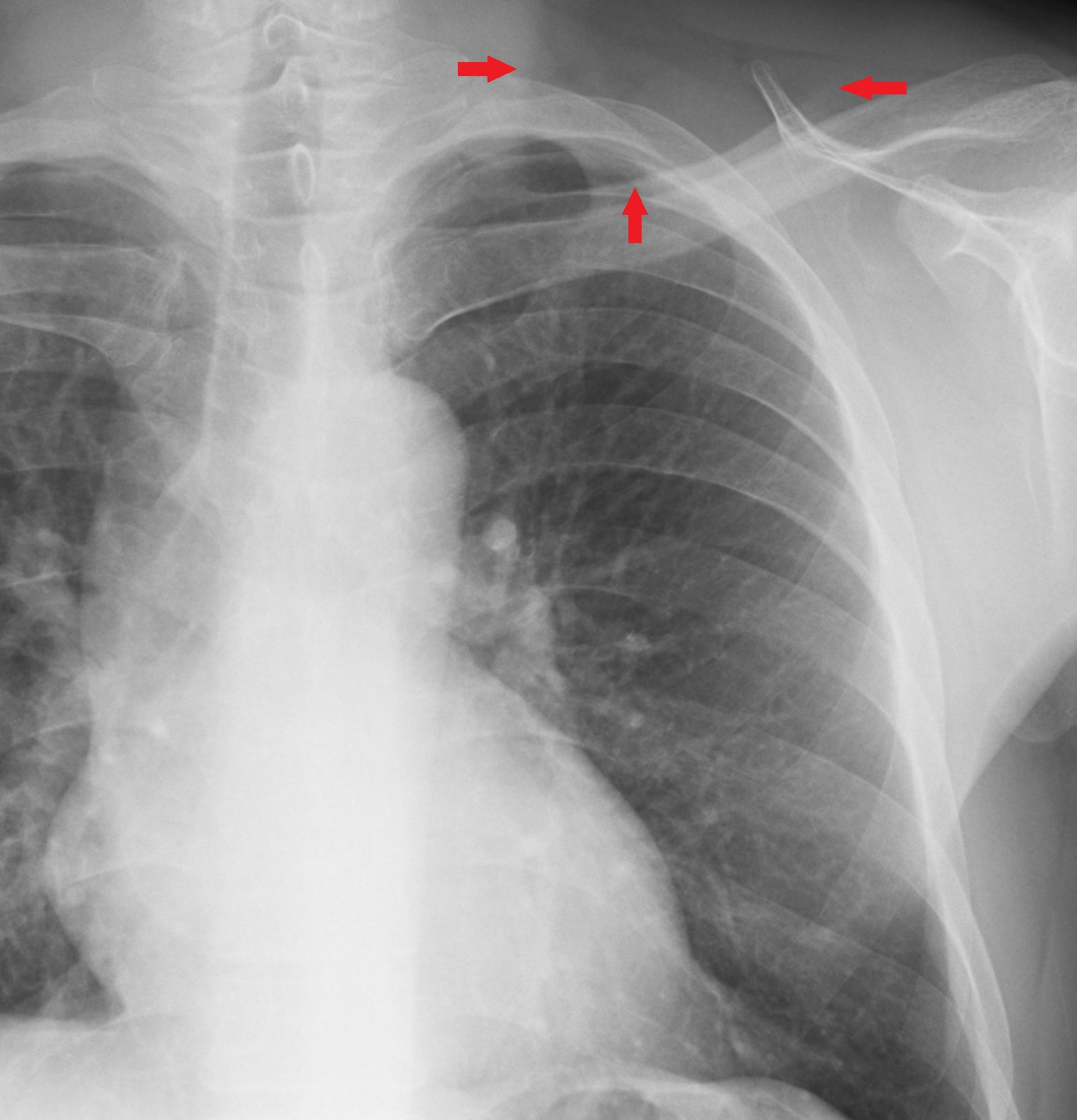
The margins of the supraclavicular fossa are often visible on chest X-ray
