= Greater occipital nerve =

Nerve of the head

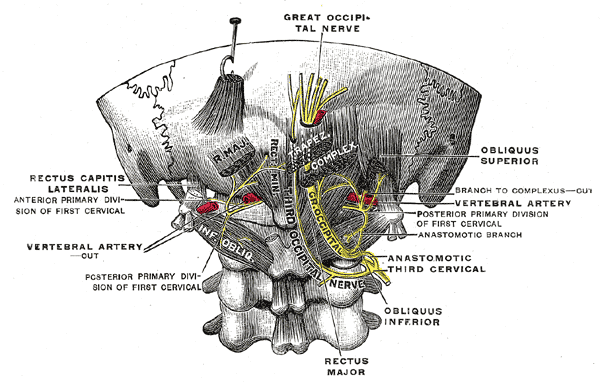
- Posterior primary divisions of the upper three cervical nerves. (Great occipital nerve labeled at center top.)

Details
- From: C2
- Innervates: Semispinalis capitis, scalp

Identifiers
- Latin: nervus occipitalis major
- TA98: A14.2.02.008
- TA2: 6366
- FMA: 65443

The greater occipital nerve is a nerve of the head. It is a spinal nerve, specifically the medial branch of the dorsal primary ramus of cervical spinal nerve 2. It arises from between the first and second cervical vertebrae, ascends, and then passes through the semispinalis muscle. It ascends further to supply the skin along the posterior part of the scalp to the vertex. It supplies sensation to the scalp at the top of the head, over the ear and over the parotid glands.

== Structure ==
The greater occipital nerve is the medial branch of the dorsal primary ramus of cervical spinal nerve 2. It may also involve fibres from cervical spinal nerve 3. It arises from between the first and second cervical vertebrae, along with the lesser occipital nerve. It ascends after emerging from below the suboccipital triangle beneath the obliquus capitis inferior muscle. Just below the superior nuchal ridge, it pierces the fascia. It ascends further to supply the skin along the posterior part of the scalp up to the vertex.

== Function ==
The greater occipital nerve supplies sensation to the scalp at the top of the head, over the ear and over the parotid glands.

== Clinical significance ==
Problems with the greater occipital nerve may be a cause of cervicogenic headaches. These may be referred to as occipital neuralgias. A common site, and usually misdiagnosed area of entrapment for the greater occipital nerve, is at the obliquus capitis inferior muscle. These may be treated with a temporary nerve block.

=== Occipital pain management ===
Most people with tension headaches experience increasing intensity with time, and report pain originating in the back of the head (occipital) moving to the front of the head (supraorbital). Neurostimulation is sometimes used to treat tension headaches that originate from the occipital nerve.

== Additional images ==
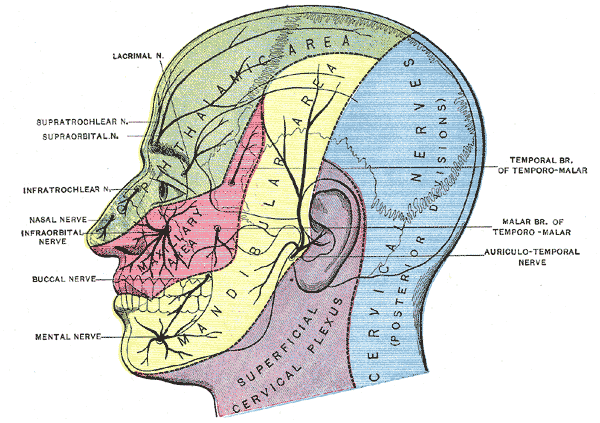
Dermatome distribution of the trigeminal nerve

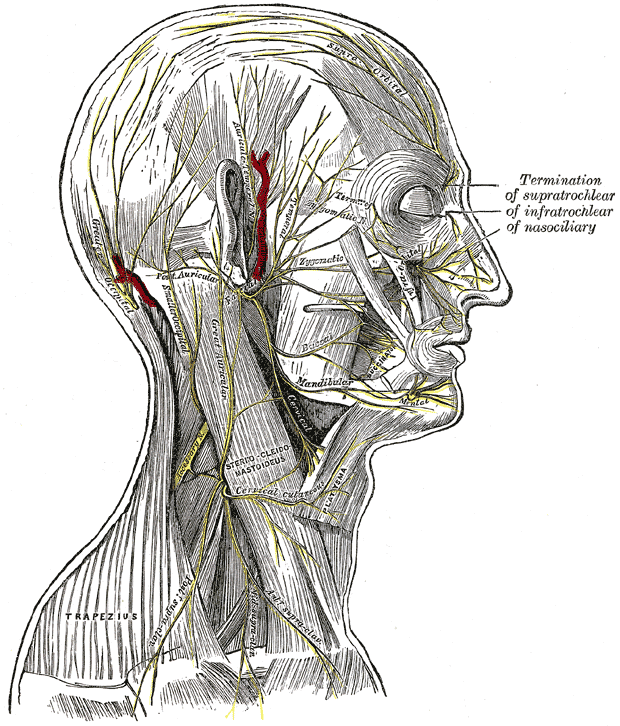
The nerves of the scalp, face, and side of neck.

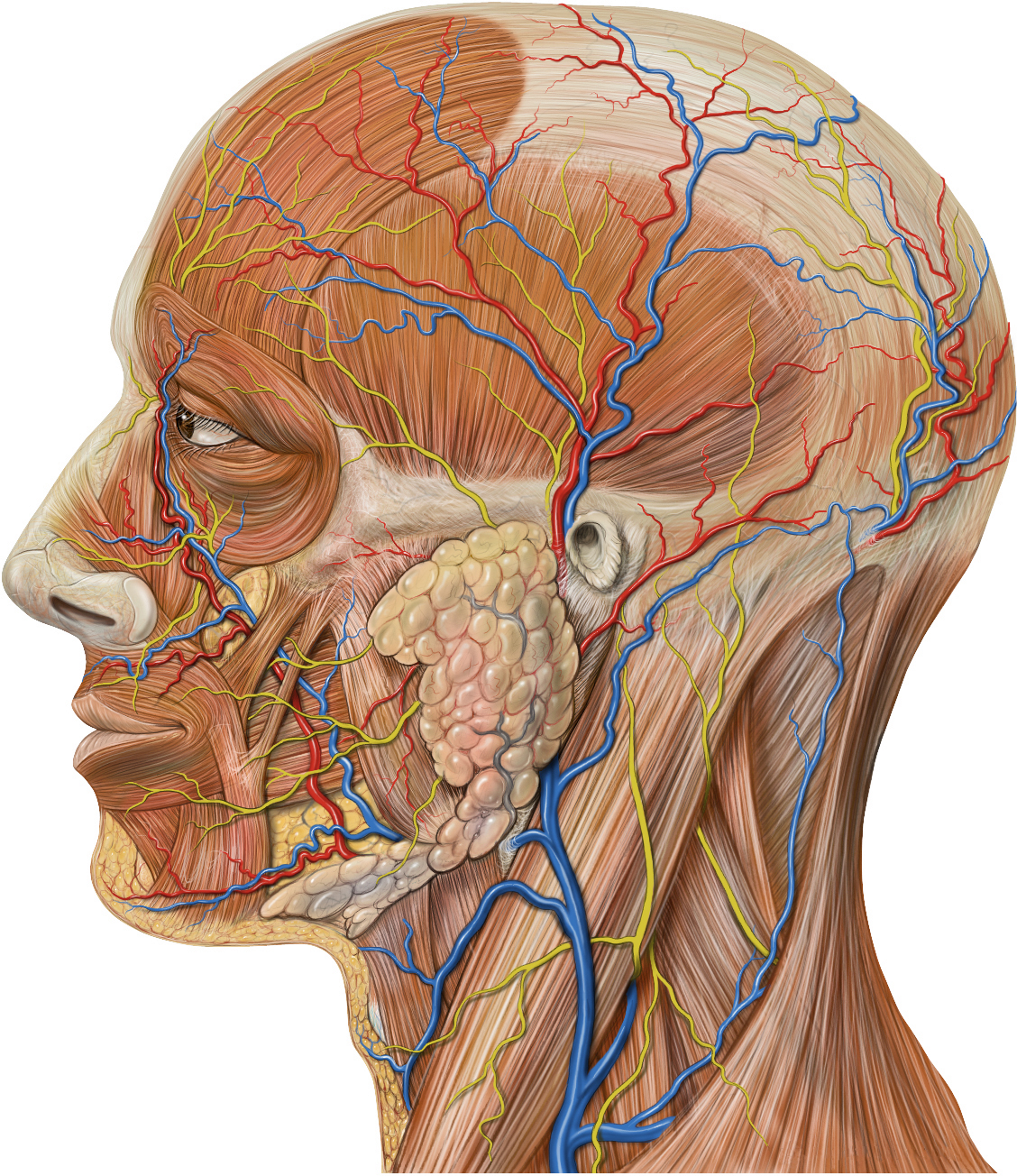
Lateral head anatomy detail
