= Cervical spinal nerve 2 =

Spinal nerve of the cervical segment

Cervical spinal nerve
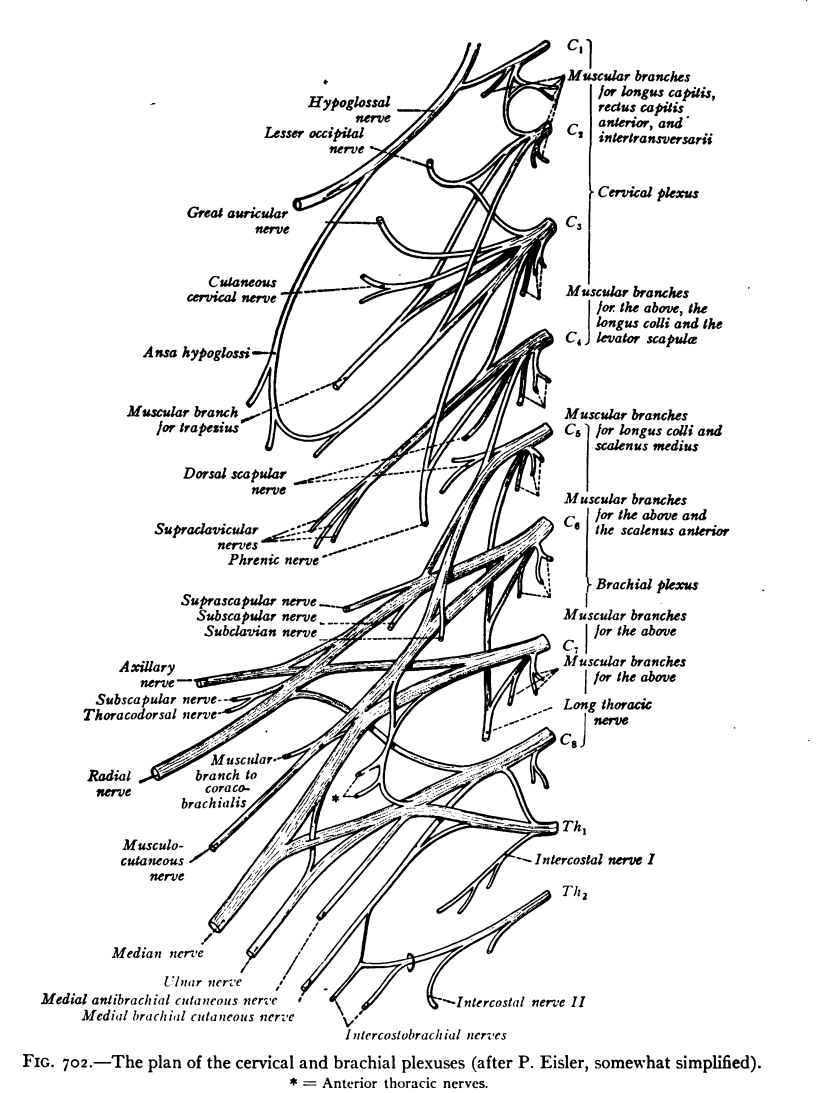
- The plan of the cervical and brachial plexuses.

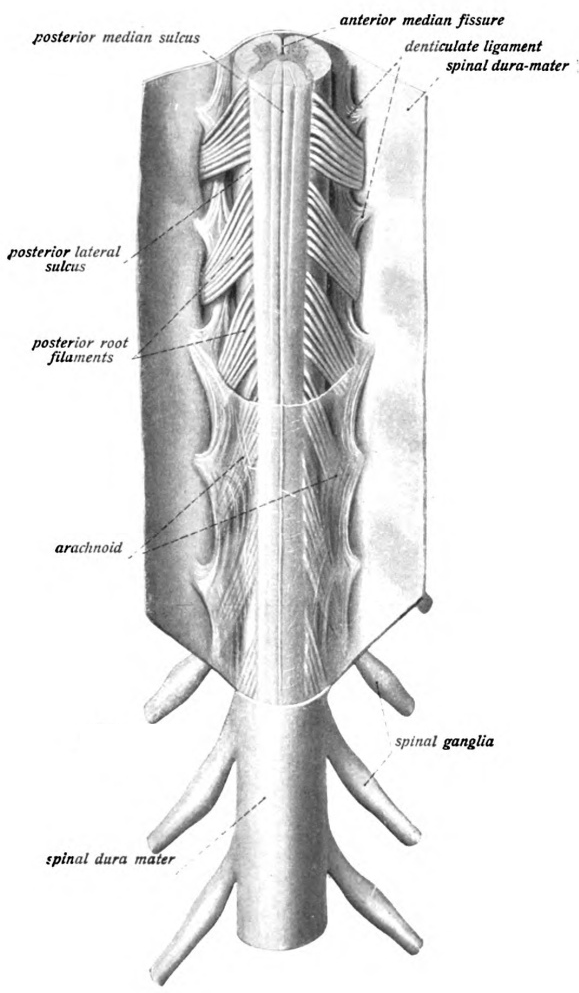
- The spinal cord with spinal nerves.

Details

Identifiers
- Latin: nervi spinalis
- FMA: 6443

The cervical spinal nerve 2 (C2) is a spinal nerve of the cervical segment. It is a part of the ansa cervicalis along with the C1 and C3 nerves sometimes forming part of superior root of the ansa cervicalis. it also connects into the inferior root of the ansa cervicalis with the C3.

The C2 spinal nerve originates from the spinal cord through a small bony opening known as the intervertebral foramen located above the C2 vertebra at the atlantoaxial joint.

This nerve consists of both sensory and motor components. The C2 dermatome covers specific regions of the skin that transmit sensory input from cutaneous sensory receptors proximally up the C2 nerve. These areas encompass the upper and posterior parts of the scalp, the skin on the front of the neck, and the earlobes. The C2 myotome represents a collection of muscles under the control of the C2 nerve. C2 innervates the rectus capitis anterior and rectus capitis lateralis muscles. These muscles are responsible for enabling the forward bending of the neck.

The greater occipital nerve, lesser occipital nerve, greater auricular nerve, and the transverse cervical nerve all emerge from C2, with the latter two shared with the C3.

== Additional images ==
The C2 dermatome, representing the region of the skin innervated by the sensory fibers of the C2 nerve.
