= Occipital neuralgia =

- Other names: C2 neuralgia, Arnold's neuralgia
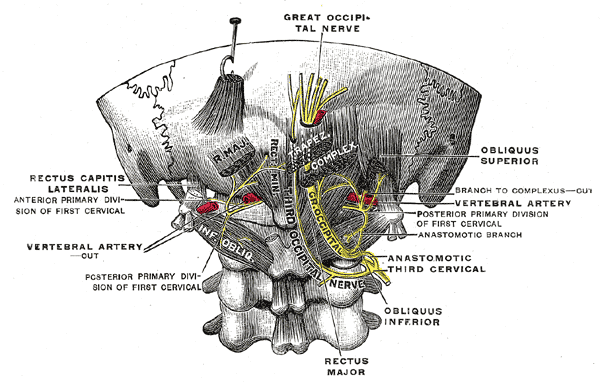
- Illustration of the affected nerves
- Specialty: Neurology

Occipital neuralgia (ON) is a painful condition affecting the posterior head in the distributions of the greater occipital nerve (GON), lesser occipital nerve (LON), third occipital nerve (TON), or a combination of the three. It is paroxysmal, lasting from seconds to minutes, and often consists of lancinating pain that directly results from the pathology of one of these nerves. There are multiple treatment modalities, several of which have well-established efficacy in treating this condition.

== Signs and symptoms ==
Patients presenting with a headache originating at the posterior skull base should be evaluated for ON. This condition typically presents as a paroxysmal, lancinating or stabbing pain lasting from seconds to minutes, and therefore a continuous, aching pain likely indicates a different diagnosis. Bilateral symptoms are present in one-third of cases.

== Causes ==
Occipital neuralgia is caused by damage to the occipital nerves, which can arise from trauma (usually concussive or cervical), physical stress on the nerve, repetitive neck contraction, flexion or extension, and/or as a result of medical complications (such as osteochondroma, a benign bone tumour). A rare cause is a cerebrospinal fluid leak. Rarely, occipital neuralgia may be a symptom of metastasis of certain cancers to the spine. Among other cranial neuropathies, occipital neuralgia is also known to occur in patients with multiple sclerosis.

== Differential diagnosis ==
The conditions most easily mistaken with ON for other headache and facial pain disorders include migraine, cluster headache, tension headache, and hemicrania continua. Mechanical neck pain from an upper disc, facet, or musculoligamentous sources may refer to the occiput, but is not classically lancinating or otherwise neuropathic and should not be confused with ON. A crucial step in differentiating ON from other disorders is relief with an occipital nerve block.

== Epidemiology ==
In one study investigating the incidence of facial pain in a Dutch population, ON comprised 8.3% of facial pain cases. The total incidence of ON was 3.2 per 100,000 people, with a mean age of diagnosis of 54.1 years.

== Treatment ==
There are multiple treatment options for ON. The most conservative treatments, such as immobilization of the neck with a cervical collar, physiotherapy, and cryotherapy have not been shown to perform better than placebo. Non-steroidal anti-inflammatory drugs, tricyclic antidepressants, serotonin-norepinephrine reuptake inhibitors, and anticonvulsants may help to alleviate symptoms. Following diagnostic nerve blocks, therapeutic blocks may be attempted. Typically, a steroid is added to the local anesthetic with variable results. Botulinum Toxin A injection has emerged as a treatment with a conceptually lower side effect profile than many other techniques described here, with most recent trials demonstrating 50% or more improvement.

It remains a common practice to utilize a landmark-only approach when performing greater and lesser occipital nerve blocks. For blockade of both nerves, medication is infiltrated along the nuchal ridge. This technique, while easy to perform and relatively safe if done correctly, may not be particularly accurate and as a result, could theoretically increase the risk of a false-positive result. To improve accuracy, ultrasound-guided techniques were developed. The original ultrasound-guided technique for injection of the GON was described by Greher and colleagues in 2010; it targets the nerve as it courses superficial to the obliquus capitis inferior muscle at the C1-C2 level.

There are several advanced interventional procedures in clinical use:

- Pulsed or thermal radiofrequency ablation (RFA) may be considered for longer-lasting relief after a local anesthetic blockade confirms the diagnosis. Thermal RFA aimed at destroying the nerve architecture can render long-term analgesia but also comes with the potential risks of hypesthesia, dysesthesia, anesthesia dolorosa, and painful neuroma formation. Chemical neurolysis with alcohol or phenol carries the same risks as thermal RFA. There is no such risk with pulsed RF, however, some question its efficacy as compared to other procedures.
- Neuromodulation of the occipital nerve(s) involves the placement of nerve stimulator leads in a horizontal or oblique orientation at the base of the skull across where the greater occipital nerve emerges. Patients should be trialed with temporary leads first, and greater than 50% pain relief for several days is considered a successful trial, after which permanent implantation may be considered. Risks include surgical site infection and lead or generator displacement or fracture after the operation.
- Ultrasound-guided percutaneous cryoablation of the GON is sometimes performed. At the correct temperature, there should be stunning but not permanent damage of the nerve, but at temperatures below negative 70 degrees Celsius, nerve injury is possible. Most recently in the literature, a 2018 article by Kastler and colleagues described 7 patients who underwent cryoneurolysis in a non-blinded fashion to good effect, but the follow-up was limited to 3 months.
- Surgical decompression is often considered to be the last resort. In one study of 11 patients, only two patients did not experience significant pain relief postoperatively and mean pain episodes per month decreased from 17.1 to 4.1, with mean pain intensity scores also decreasing from 7.18 to 1.73. Resection of part of the obliquus capitis inferior muscle has shown success in patients who have an exacerbation of their pain with flexion of the cervical spine. Another popular surgical technique is C2 gangliotomy, even though patients are left with several days of intermittent nausea and dizziness. As with any large nerve resection, there is a theoretical risk of developing a deafferentation syndrome, though arguably the risk is lower if the resection is pre-ganglionic.
