= Lumbar triangle =

Part of the human abdomen

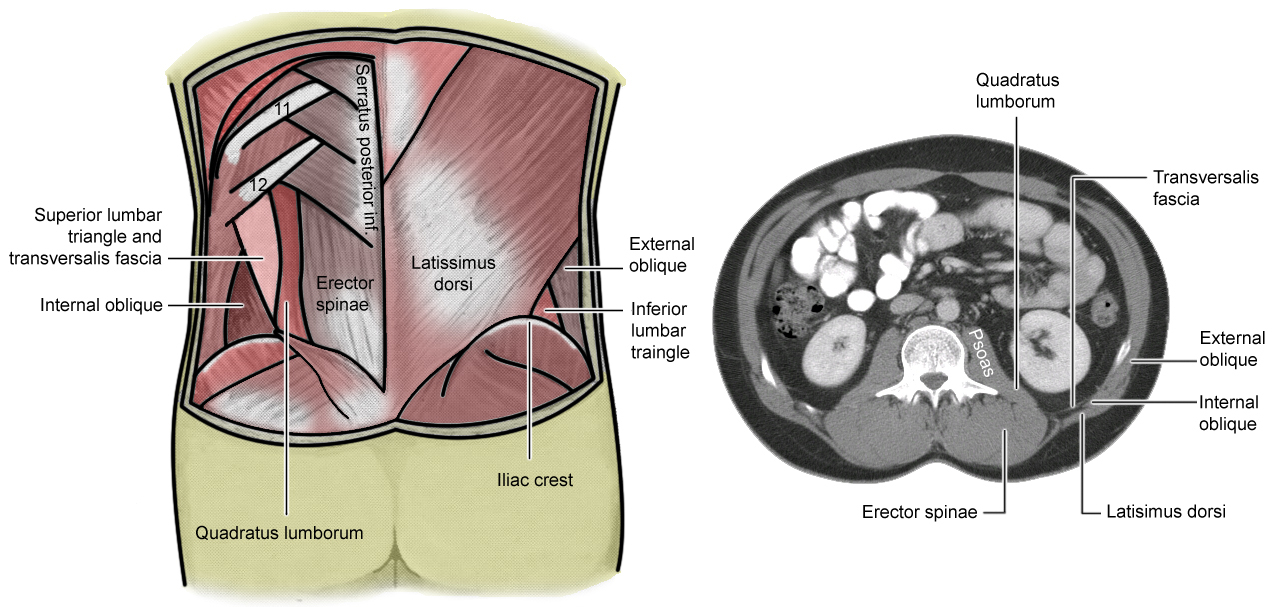
- The superior and inferior lumbar triangles with a cross section at the level of the superior lumbar triangle

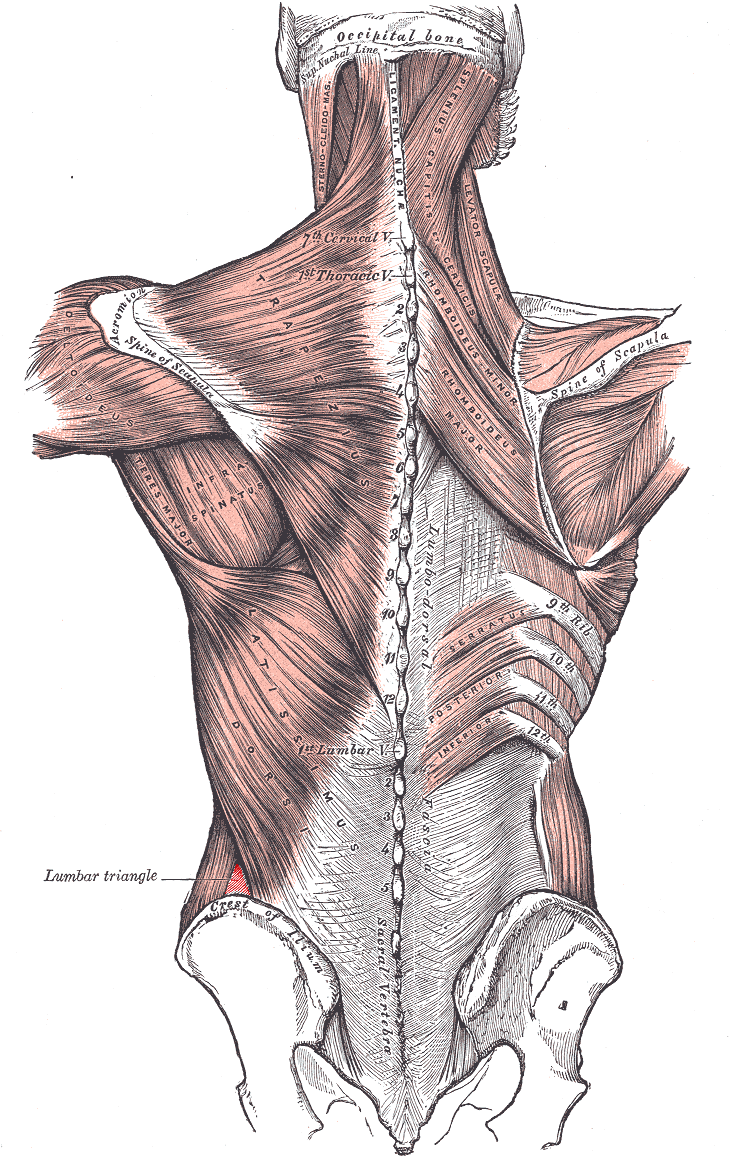
- Posterior view of muscles connecting the upper extremity to the vertebral column. Lumbar triangle is labeled in red at bottom left.

Details

Identifiers
- Latin: trigonum lumbale
- TA98: A01.2.05.009
- TA2: 270
- FMA: 75023

The lumbar triangle can refer to either the inferior lumbar (Petit) triangle, which lies superficially, or the superior lumbar (Grynfeltt) triangle, which is deep and superior to the inferior triangle. Of the two, the superior triangle is the more consistently found in cadavers and is more commonly the site of herniation; however, the inferior lumbar triangle is often simply called the lumbar triangle, perhaps owing to its more superficial location and ease in demonstration.

== Inferior lumbar (Petit) triangle ==
The margins of the inferior lumbar (Petit's) triangle are composed of the iliac crest inferiorly and the margins of two muscles – latissimus dorsi (posteriorly) and external abdominal oblique (anteriorly). The floor of the inferior lumbar triangle is the internal abdominal oblique muscle. The fact that herniations occasionally occur here is of clinical importance. A lumbar hernia here is called a Petit's hernia.

== Superior lumbar (Grynfeltt-Lesshaft) triangle ==
The superior lumbar (Grynfeltt-Lesshaft) triangle is formed medially by the quadratus lumborum, laterally by the posterior border of internal abdominal oblique muscle, and superiorly by the 12th rib. The floor of the superior lumbar triangle is the transversalis fascia and its roof is the external abdominal oblique muscle. A Grynfeltt-Lesshaft hernia can occur here.
