= Amyand's hernia =

- Specialty: Gastroenterology
- Symptoms: Epigastric or periumbilical pain, regional tenderness in the right lower quadrant, and an inguinal or inguino-scrotal tender irreducible mass.
- Named after: Claudius Amyand

Amyand's hernia is a rare form of an inguinal hernia (less than 1% of inguinal hernias) which occurs when the appendix is included in the hernial sac and becomes incarcerated. The condition is an eponymous disease named after a French surgeon, Claudius Amyand (1660–1740), who performed the first successful appendectomy in 1735.

Most of the cases are diagnosed intraoperatively and a preoperative diagnosis is rarely made in such cases. Management should be individualized according to appendix's inflammation stage, presence of abdominal sepsis, and comorbidity factors. The decision should be based on factors such as the patient's age, the size and anatomy of the appendix, and in case of appendicitis, standard appendectomy and herniorrhaphy without a mesh should be the standard of care.

Amyand's hernia is commonly misdiagnosed as an ordinary incarcerated hernia. Symptoms mimicking appendicitis may occur. Treatment consists of a combination of appendectomy and hernia repair. The inflammatory status of the appendix determines the type of hernia repair and the surgical approach. Incidental appendicectomy in the case of a normal appendix is not favoured.

== Signs and symptoms ==
An appendix trapped in an inguinal hernia can become inflamed, infected, or perforated. Although incarcerated, an appendix may appear to be completely healthy.

Common complaints include epigastric or periumbilical pain with regional tenderness in the right lower quadrant, as well as an inguinal or inguino-scrotal tender irreducible mass. This presentation, on the other hand, frequently gives the clinical impression of a strangulated hernia, rendering Amyand's hernia difficult to diagnose.

== Diagnosis ==
Amyand's hernia is rarely diagnosed preoperatively and the diagnosis typically occurs during surgery. Amyand's hernia is not always associated with physical, laboratory, or imaging examinations. Even though it is practically impossible clinically, preoperative diagnosis of Amyand's hernia is possible with CT and ultrasound technology. The appendix can be seen directly inside the inguinal canal using CT. Amyand's hernia was also discovered by chance during a barium enema.

Differential diagnosis includes Inguinal adenitis, epididymitis, testicular tumor with hemorrhage, strangulated hernia, strangulated omentocele, Richter's hernia, and acute hydrocele.

== Treatment ==
Amyand's hernia is traditionally treated with appendectomy, abscess drainage if present, hernia reduction, and hernioplasty through the same incision. In cases of inflammation, peritonitis, or cecum incarceration, an ischemic right hemicolectomy may be required.

== Epidemiology ==
Amyand's hernia is found in about 1% of all inguinal hernias, and appendicitis caused by an Amyand's hernia accounts for 0.1% of all appendicitis cases. According to recent research, its true prevalence is even lower, ranging between 0.4% and 0.6% of all inguinal hernias. Amyand's hernia is about three times more common in children, and its prevalence can reach up to 1%.

== History ==
Creese proposed the term "Amyand hernia" in 1953, followed by Hiatt and Hiatt in 1988, and Hutchinson in 1993, in honor of Claudius Amyand. Claudius Amyand was a French Huguenot in exile in the United Kingdom, a military surgeon, a Sergeant in the British Army and a Surgeon to King George II, a Fellow of the Royal Society, the first Principal Surgeon of the Westminster Hospital, and founder and first Principal Surgeon of St. George's Hospital. On December 6, 1735, he carried out the first successful appendicectomy on an 11-year-old boy named Hanvil Anderson, who had been diagnosed with a fistula discharging feces in the groin.

== See also ==
- Inguinal hernia
- Claudius Amyand
