= Hernia =

Abnormal exit of tissues or organs from the cavity they usually reside in

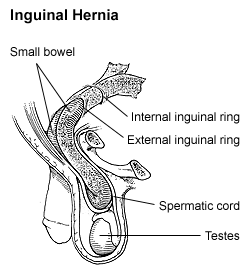
- Diagram of an indirect inguinal hernia (view from the side)
- Specialty: General surgery
- Symptoms: Pain especially with coughing, bulging area
- Complications: Bowel strangulation
- Usual onset: < 1 year and > 50 years old (groin hernias)
- Risk factors: Smoking, chronic obstructive pulmonary disease, obesity, pregnancy, peritoneal dialysis, collagen vascular disease, connective tissue disease
- Diagnostic method: Based on symptoms, medical imaging
- Treatment: Observation, surgery
- Frequency: 18.5 million (2015)
- Deaths: 59,800 (2015)

A hernia (pl.: hernias or herniae, from Latin, meaning 'rupture') is the abnormal exit of tissue or an organ, such as the bowel, through the wall of the cavity in which it normally resides. The term is also used for the normal development of the intestinal tract, referring to the retraction of the intestine from the extra-embryonal navel coelom into the abdomen in the healthy embryo at about 7 1/2 weeks.

Various types of hernias can occur, most commonly involving the abdomen, and specifically the groin. Groin hernias are most commonly inguinal hernias but may also be femoral hernias. Other types of hernias include hiatus, incisional, and umbilical hernias. Symptoms are present in about 66% of people with groin hernias. This may include pain or discomfort in the lower abdomen, especially with coughing, exercise, or urinating or defecating. Often, it gets worse throughout the day and improves when lying down. A bulge may appear at the site of hernia, that becomes larger when bending down.

Groin hernias occur more often on the right than left side. The main concern is bowel strangulation, where the blood supply to part of the bowel is blocked. This usually produces severe pain and tenderness in the area. Hiatus, or hiatal hernias often result in heartburn but may also cause chest pain or pain while eating.

Risk factors for the development of a hernia include smoking, chronic obstructive pulmonary disease, obesity, pregnancy, peritoneal dialysis, collagen vascular disease, and previous open appendectomy, among others. Predisposition to hernias is genetic and occur more often in certain families. Deleterious mutations causing predisposition to hernias seem to have dominant inheritance (especially for men). It is unclear if groin hernias are associated with heavy lifting. Hernias can often be diagnosed based on signs and symptoms. Occasionally, medical imaging is used to confirm the diagnosis or rule out other possible causes. The diagnosis of hiatus hernias is often done by endoscopy.

Groin hernias that do not cause symptoms in males do not need immediate surgical repair, a practice referred to as "watchful waiting". However most men tend to eventually undergo groin hernia surgery due to the development of pain. For women, however, repair is generally recommended due to the higher rate of femoral hernias, which have more complications. If strangulation occurs, immediate surgery is required. Repair may be done by open surgery, laparoscopic surgery, or robotic-assisted surgery. Open surgery has the benefit of possibly being done under local anesthesia rather than general anesthesia. Laparoscopic surgery generally has less pain following the procedure. A hiatus hernia may be treated with lifestyle changes such as raising the head of the bed, weight loss and adjusting eating habits. The medications H2 blockers or proton pump inhibitors may help. If the symptoms do not improve with medications, a surgery known as laparoscopic Nissen fundoplication may be an option.

Globally in 2019, there were 32.53 million prevalent cases of inguinal, femoral, and abdominal hernias, with a 95% uncertainty interval ranging from 27.71 to 37.79 million. Additionally, there were 13.02 million incident cases, with an uncertainty interval of 10.68 to 15.49 million. These figures reflect a 36.00% increase in prevalent cases and a 63.67% increase in incident cases compared to the numbers reported in 1990. About 27% of males and 3% of females develop a groin hernia at some point in their lives. Inguinal, femoral and abdominal hernias were present in 18.5 million people and resulted in 59,800 deaths in 2015. Groin hernias occur most often before the age of 1 and after the age of 50. It is not known how commonly hiatus hernias occur, with estimates in North America varying from 10% to 80%. The first known description of a hernia dates back to at least 1550 BC, in the Ebers Papyrus from Egypt.

== Signs and symptoms ==
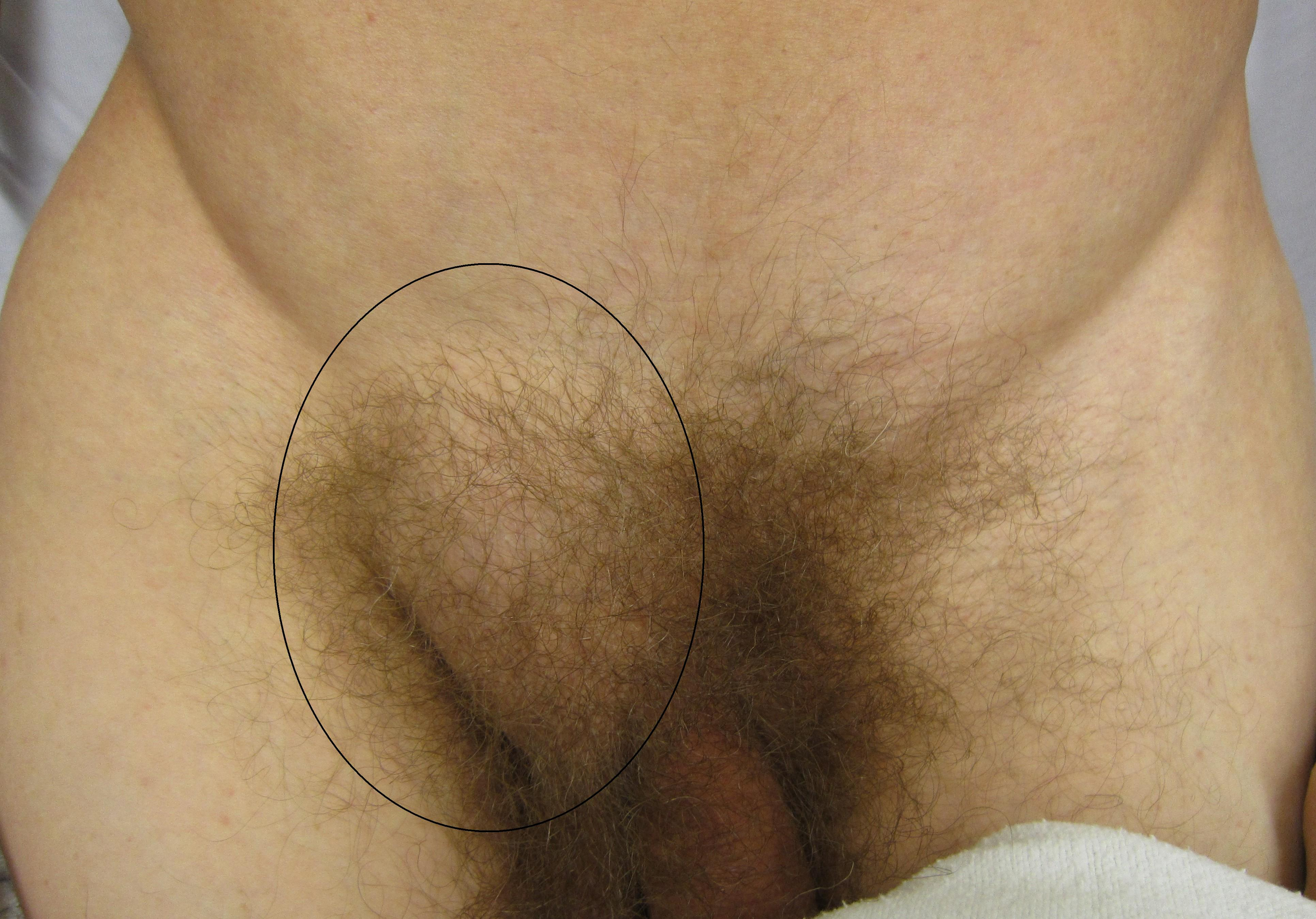
Frontal view of an inguinal hernia (right).

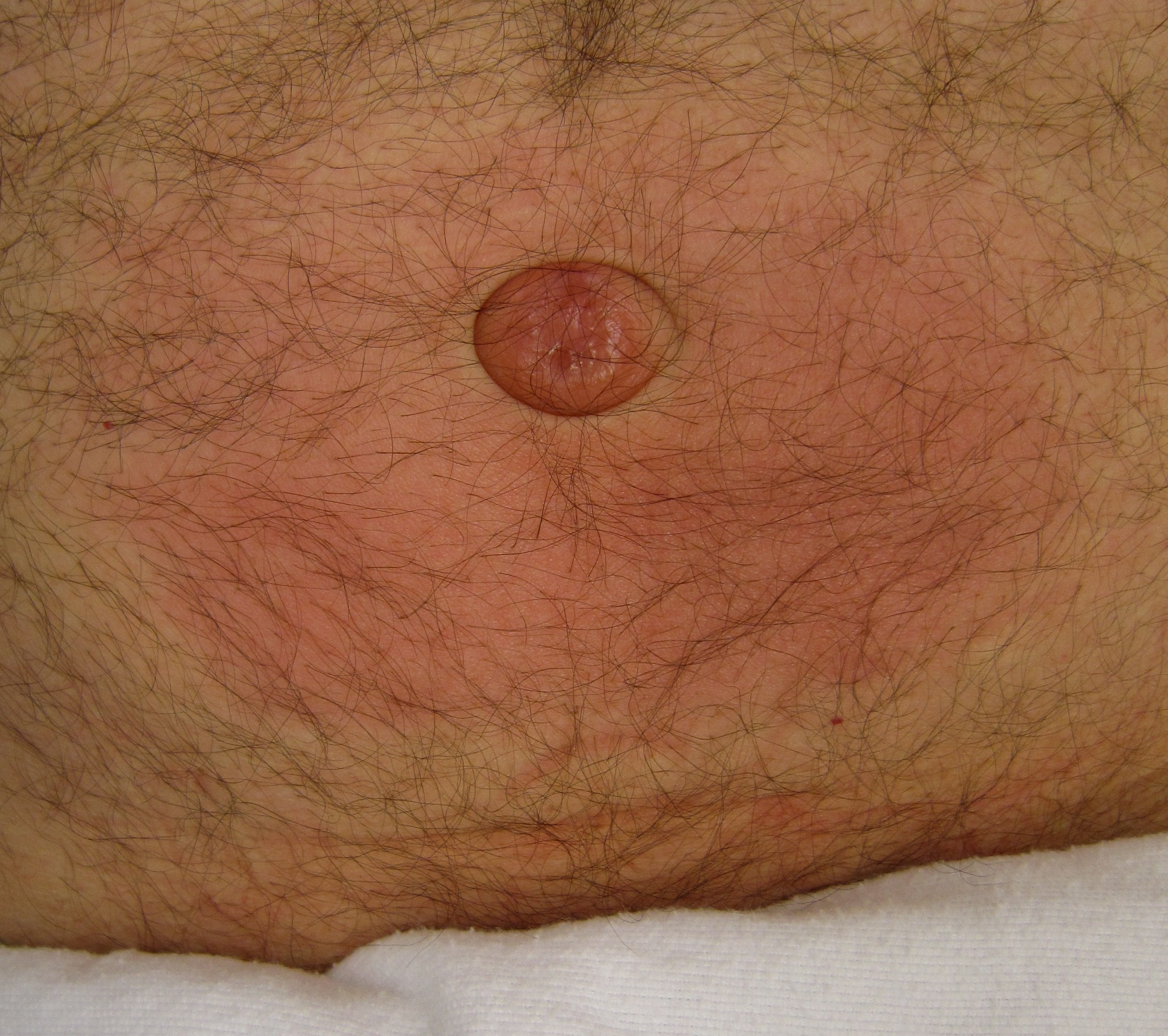
Incarcerated umbilical hernia with surrounding inflammation

Symptoms and signs vary depending on the type of hernia. By far the most common hernias develop in the abdomen when a weakness in the abdominal wall evolves into a localized hole, or "defect", through which adipose tissue, or abdominal organs covered with peritoneum, may protrude. Another common hernia involves the spinal discs and causes sciatica. A hiatus hernia occurs when the stomach protrudes into the mediastinum through the esophageal opening in the diaphragm.

Hernias might manifest with pain in the area, a noticeable lump, or less specific symptoms caused by pressure on an organ stuck within the hernia, potentially leading to organ dysfunction. Typically, fatty tissue is the initial entrant into a hernia, but it might also involve an organ. Hernias are caused by a disruption or opening in the fascia, or fibrous tissue, which forms the abdominal wall. It is possible for the bulge associated with a hernia to come and go, but the defect in the tissue will persist.

Symptoms may or may not be present in some inguinal hernias. In the case of reducible hernias, a bulge in the groin or in another abdominal area can often be seen and felt. When standing, such a bulge becomes more obvious. Besides the bulge, other symptoms include pain in the groin that may also include a heavy or dragging sensation, and in men, there is sometimes pain and swelling in the scrotum around the testicular area.

Irreducible abdominal hernias or incarcerated hernias may be painful, but their most relevant symptom is that they cannot return to the abdominal cavity when pushed in. They may be chronic, although painless, and can lead to strangulation (loss of blood supply), obstruction (kinking of intestine), or both. Strangulated hernias are always painful and pain is followed by tenderness. Nausea, vomiting, or fever may occur in these cases due to bowel obstruction. Also, the hernia bulge, in this case, may turn red, purple or dark and pink.

In the diagnosis of abdominal hernias, imaging is the principal means of detecting internal diaphragmatic and other nonpalpable or unsuspected hernias. Multidetector CT (MDCT) can show with precision the anatomic site of the hernia sac, the contents of the sac, and any complications. MDCT also offers clear detail of the abdominal wall allowing wall hernias to be identified accurately.

Inguinal hernia. By pushing on the hernia, it can be (reduced) pushed into the abdomen. When the pressure is removed, the hernia quickly reappears.

=== Complications ===
Untreated hernia may be complicated by:

- Inflammation
- Obstruction of any lumen, such as bowel obstruction in intestinal hernias
- Strangulation
- Hydrocele of the hernial sac
- Hemorrhage
- Autoimmune problems
- Irreducibility or incarceration, in which it cannot be reduced, or pushed back into place, at least not without very much external effort. In intestinal hernias, this also substantially increases the risk of bowel obstruction and strangulation.

== Causes ==
Causes of hiatus hernia vary depending on each individual. Among the multiple causes, however, are the mechanical causes which include: improper heavy weight lifting, hard coughing bouts, sharp blows to the abdomen, and incorrect posture.

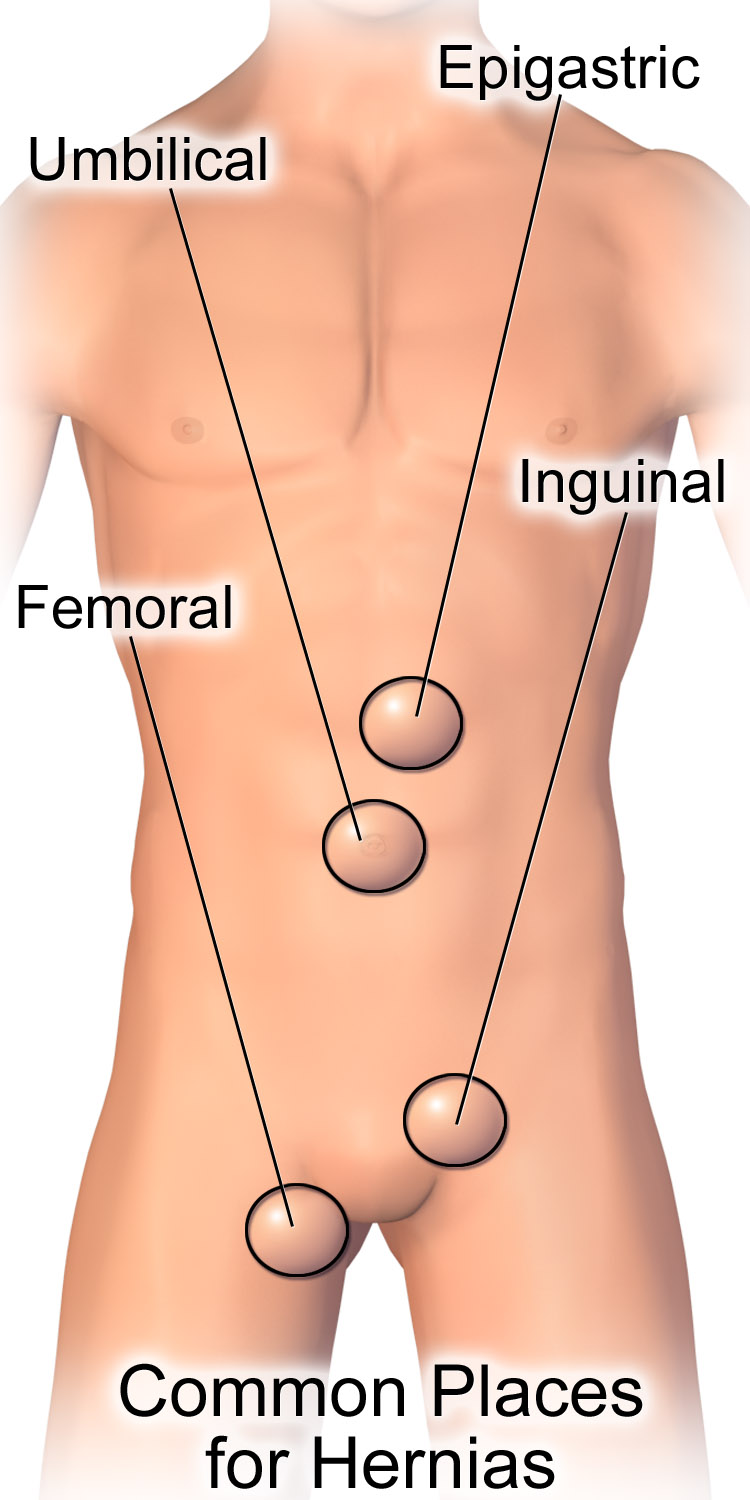
Common sites for hernias

Furthermore, conditions that increase the pressure of the abdominal cavity may also cause hernias or worsen the existing ones. Some examples would be: obesity, straining during a bowel movement or urination (constipation, enlarged prostate), chronic lung disease, and also, fluid in the abdominal cavity (ascites). Also, if muscles are weakened due to poor nutrition, smoking, and overexertion, hernias are more likely to occur.

The physiological school of thought contends that in the case of inguinal hernia, the above-mentioned are only an anatomical symptom of the underlying physiological cause. They contend that the risk of hernia is due to a physiological difference between patients who have hernia and those who do not, namely the presence of aponeurotic extensions from the transversus abdominis aponeurotic arch. There isn't any proof that being physically active will cause a hernia to get stuck or make an existing hernia worse.Abdominal wall hernia may occur due to trauma. If this type of hernia is due to blunt trauma it is an emergency condition and could be associated with various solid organs and hollow viscus injuries.

== Pathogenesis ==
Most hernias happen when the muscles and tendons in the belly weaken or get damaged, which makes it hard for them to keep the insides in place and support the body properly. The belly and pelvis act like a container made of muscles, tendons and bones. When pressure builds up inside this container, the muscles push back to keep everything in place. If the pressure gets too high, it may cause the belly's wall to break, leading to a hernia. Once a hernia starts, it keeps enlarging, because the tension on the wall there increases.

== Diagnosis ==
=== Inguinal ===
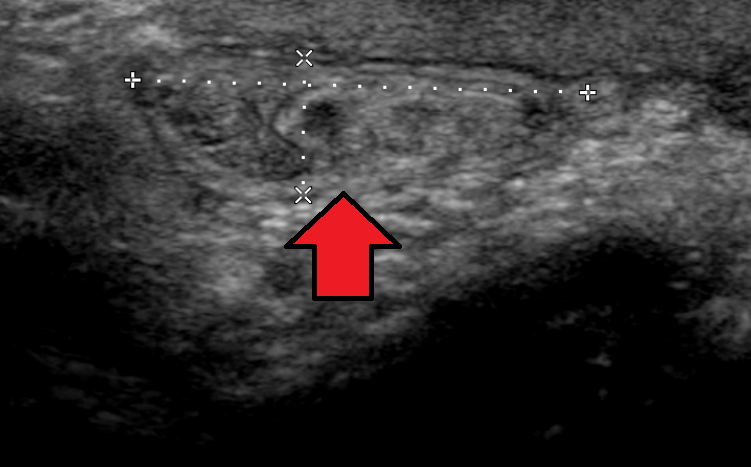
Ultrasound showing an inguinal hernia

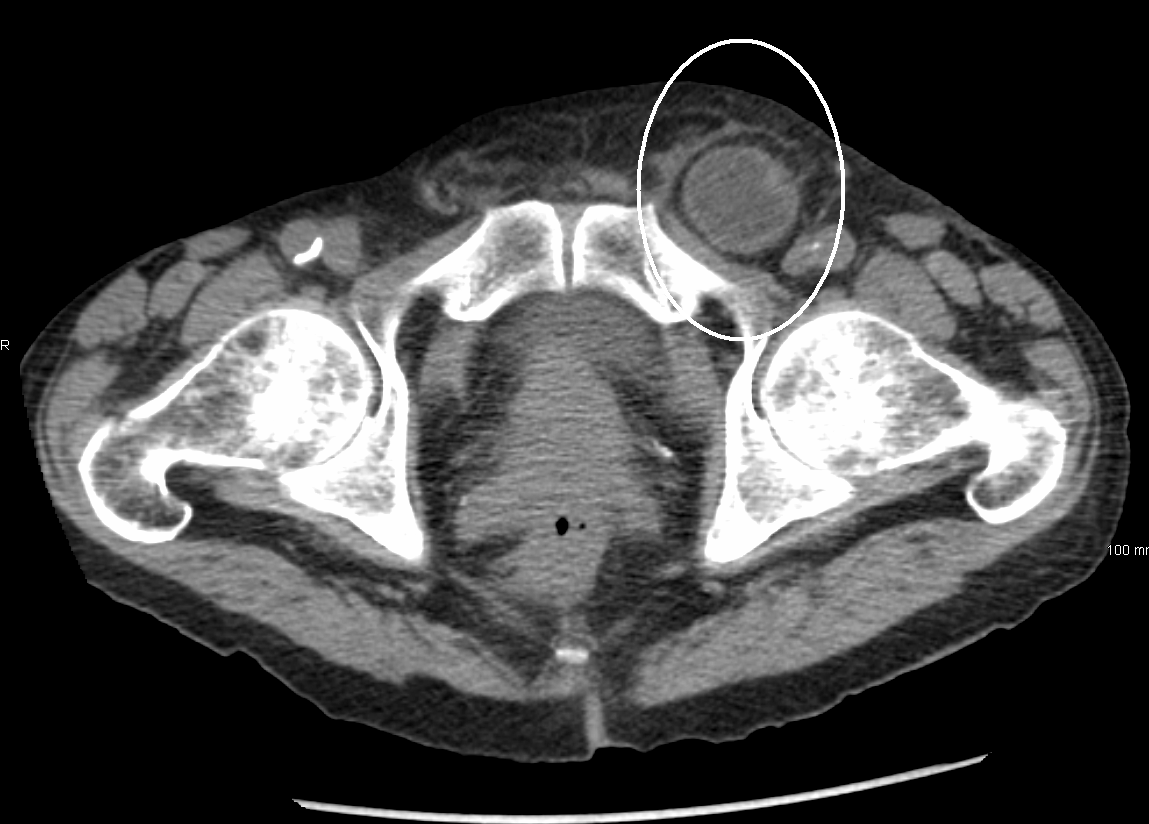
An incarcerated inguinal hernia as seen on CT

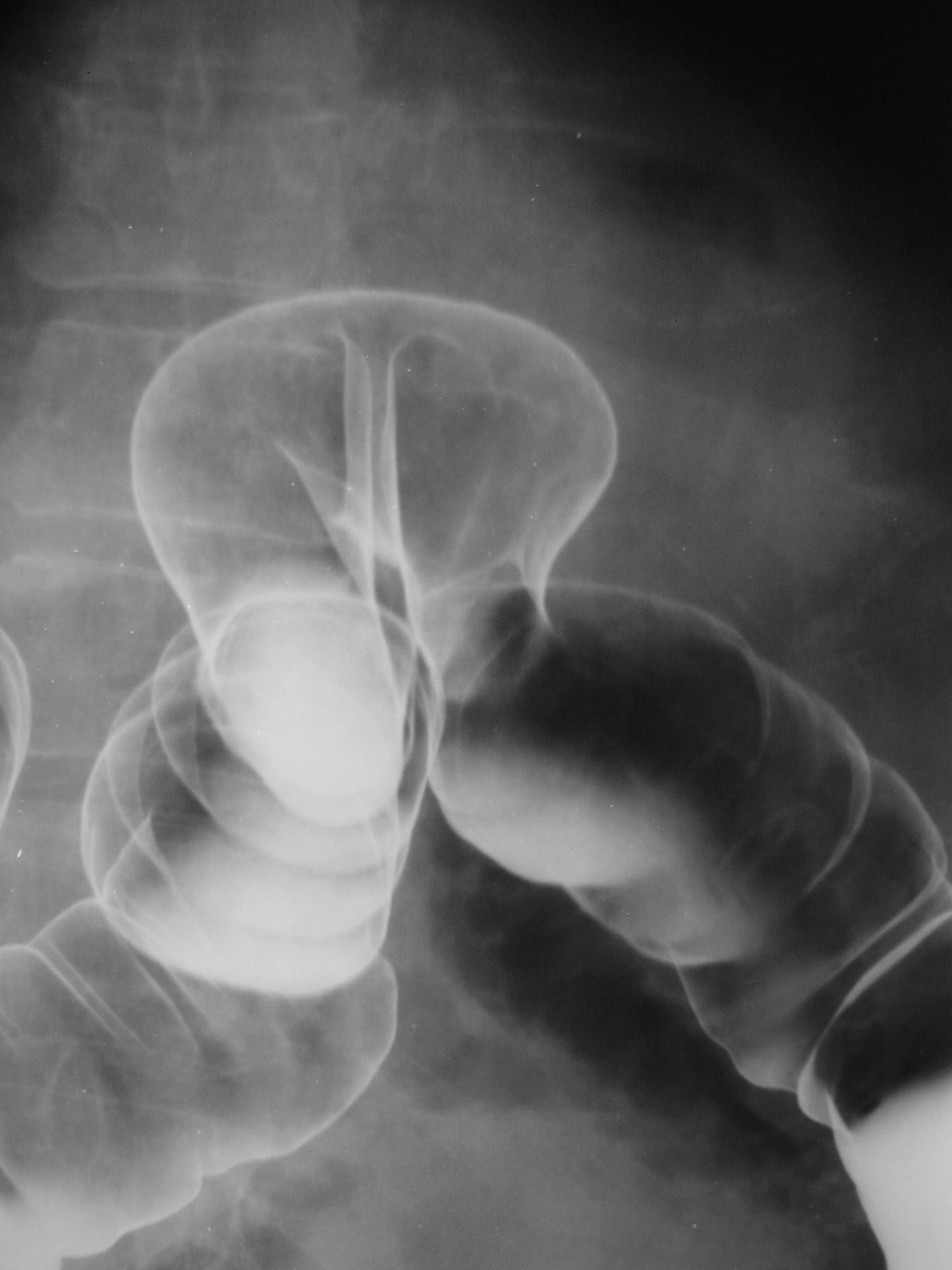
X-ray of colonic herniation

By far, the most common hernias (up to 75% of all abdominal hernias) are inguinal hernias, which are further divided into the more common indirect inguinal hernia (2/3, depicted here), in which the inguinal canal is entered via a congenital weakness at its entrance (the internal inguinal ring), and the direct inguinal hernia type (1/3), where the hernia contents push through a weak spot in the back wall of the inguinal canal. An indirect inguinal hernia and a direct inguinal hernia can be distinguished by their positioning in relation to the inferior epigastric vessels: an indirect hernia is situated laterally to these vessels, whereas a direct hernia is positioned medially to them. Inguinal hernias are the most common type of hernia in both men and women. In some selected cases, they may require surgery.There are special cases where a direct and indirect hernia appear together. A pantaloon hernia (or saddlebag hernia) is a combined direct and indirect hernia when the hernial sac protrudes on either side of the inferior epigastric vessels.

Additionally, though very rare, two or more indirect hernias may appear together such as in a double indirect hernia.

=== Femoral ===
Femoral hernias occur just below the inguinal ligament, when abdominal contents pass into the weak area at the posterior wall of the femoral canal. They can be hard to distinguish from the inguinal type (especially when ascending cephalad): however, they generally appear more rounded, and, in contrast to inguinal hernias, there is a strong female preponderance in femoral hernias. The incidence of strangulation in femoral hernias is high. Repair techniques are similar for femoral and inguinal hernia.A Cooper's hernia is a femoral hernia with two sacs, the first being in the femoral canal, and the second passing through a defect in the superficial fascia and appearing almost immediately beneath the skin.

=== Umbilical ===
They involve protrusion of intra-abdominal contents through a weakness at the site of passage of the umbilical cord through the abdominal wall. Umbilical hernias in adults are largely acquired, and are more frequent in obese or pregnant women. Abnormal decussation of fibers at the linea alba may be a contributing factor.

=== Incisional ===
An incisional hernia occurs when the defect is the result of an incompletely healed surgical wound. When these occur in median laparotomy incisions in the linea alba, they are termed ventral hernias. These occur in about 13% of people at 2 years following surgery.

=== Diaphragmatic ===
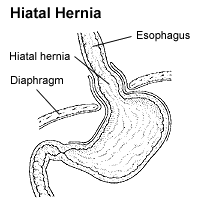
Diagram of a hiatus hernia (coronal section, viewed from the front).

Higher in the abdomen, an (internal) "diaphragmatic hernia" results when part of the stomach or intestine protrudes into the chest cavity through a defect in the diaphragm.A hiatus hernia is a particular variant of this type, in which the normal passageway through which the esophagus meets the stomach (esophageal hiatus) serves as a functional "defect", allowing part of the stomach to periodically "herniate" into the chest. Hiatus hernias may be either "sliding", in which the gastroesophageal junction itself slides through the defect into the chest, or non-sliding (also known as para-esophageal), in which case the junction remains fixed while another portion of the stomach moves up through the defect. Non-sliding or para-esophageal hernias can be dangerous as they may allow the stomach to rotate and obstruct. Repair is usually advised.

A congenital diaphragmatic hernia is a distinct problem, occurring in up to 1 in 2000 births, and requiring pediatric surgery. Intestinal organs may herniate through several parts of the diaphragm, posterolateral (in Bochdalek's triangle (lumbocostal triangle), resulting in a Bochdalek hernia), or anteromedial-retrosternal (in the cleft of foramina of Morgagni (sternocostal triangle), resulting in a Morgagni's hernia).Symptoms of a congenital diaphragmatic hernia include elevated heart rate, abnormal breathing, stomach pain, a sunken stomach, and constipation.

=== Other hernias ===
Since many organs or parts of organs can herniate through many orifices, it is very difficult to give an exhaustive list of hernias, with all synonyms and eponyms. The above article deals mostly with "visceral hernias", where the herniating tissue arises within the abdominal cavity. Other hernia types and unusual types of visceral hernias are listed below, in alphabetical order:

- Abdominal wall hernias:
  - Umbilical hernia
  - Epigastric hernia: a hernia through the linea alba above the umbilicus.
  - Spigelian hernia, also known as spontaneous lateral ventral hernia
- Amyand's hernia: containing the appendix vermiformis within the hernia sac
- Brain herniation, sometimes referred to as brain hernia, is a potentially deadly side effect of very high intracranial pressure that occurs when a part of the brain is squeezed across structures within the skull.
- Broad ligament hernia, of the uterus.
- Double indirect hernia: an indirect inguinal hernia with two hernia sacs, without a concomitant direct hernia component (as seen in a pantaloon hernia).
- Hiatus hernia: a hernia due to "short oesophagus" — insufficient elongation — stomach is displaced into the thorax
- Littre's hernia: a hernia involving a Meckel's diverticulum. It is named after the French anatomist Alexis Littré (1658–1726).
- Lumbar hernia: a hernia in the lumbar region (not to be confused with a lumbar disc hernia), contains the following entities:
  - Petit's hernia: a hernia through Petit's triangle (inferior lumbar triangle). It is named after French surgeon Jean Louis Petit (1674–1750).
  - Grynfeltt's hernia: a hernia through Grynfeltt-Lesshaft triangle (superior lumbar triangle). It is named after physician Joseph Grynfeltt (1840–1913).
- Maydl's hernia: two adjacent loops of small intestine are within a hernial sac with a tight neck. The intervening portion of bowel within the abdomen is deprived of its blood supply and eventually becomes necrotic.
- Obturator hernia: hernia through obturator canal

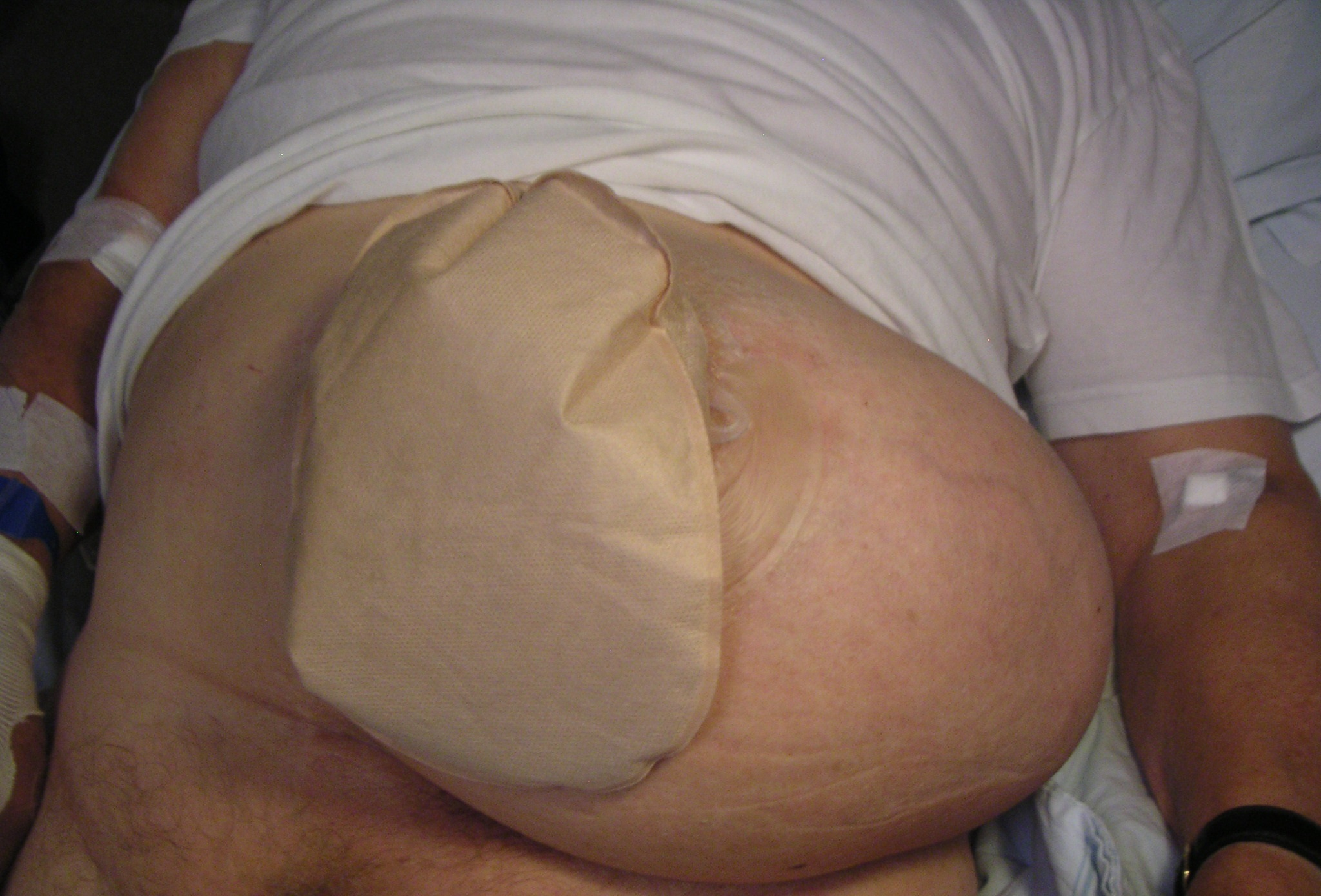
Patient with a colostomy complicated by a large parastomal hernia.

- Parastomal hernias, which is when tissue protrudes adjacent to a stoma tract. Evidence comparing different surgical techniques for stoma placement, such as lateral pararectal versus transrectal approaches, has not shown a clear difference in the risk of developing a parastomal hernia, and the certainty of the available evidence is low.
- Paraumbilical hernia: a type of umbilical hernia occurring in adults
- Perineal hernia: a perineal hernia protrudes through the muscles and fascia of the perineal floor. It may be primary but usually is acquired following perineal prostatectomy, abdominoperineal resection of the rectum, or pelvic exenteration.
- Properitoneal hernia: rare hernia located directly above the peritoneum, for example, when part of inguinal hernia projects from the deep inguinal ring to the preperitoneal space.
- Retrocolic hernia: entrapment of portions of the small intestine behind the mesocolon.
- Richter's hernia: a hernia involving only one sidewall of the bowel, which can result in bowel strangulation leading to perforation through ischaemia without causing bowel obstruction or any of its warning signs. It is named after German surgeon August Gottlieb Richter (1742–1812).
- Sliding hernia: occurs when an organ drags along part of the peritoneum, or, in other words, the organ is part of the hernia sac. The colon and the urinary bladder are often involved. The term also frequently refers to sliding hernias of the stomach.
- Sciatic hernia: this hernia in the greater sciatic foramen most commonly presents as an uncomfortable mass in the gluteal area. Bowel obstruction may also occur. This type of hernia is only a rare cause of sciatic neuralgia.
- Sports hernia: a hernia characterized by chronic groin pain in athletes and a dilated superficial inguinal ring.
- Tibialis anterior hernia: can present as a bulge in the shins. Pain on rest, walking, or during exercise may occur. The bulge can typically not be present unless pressure or flexing of the leg occurs.
- Velpeau hernia: a hernia in the groin in front of the femoral blood vessels

== Treatment ==
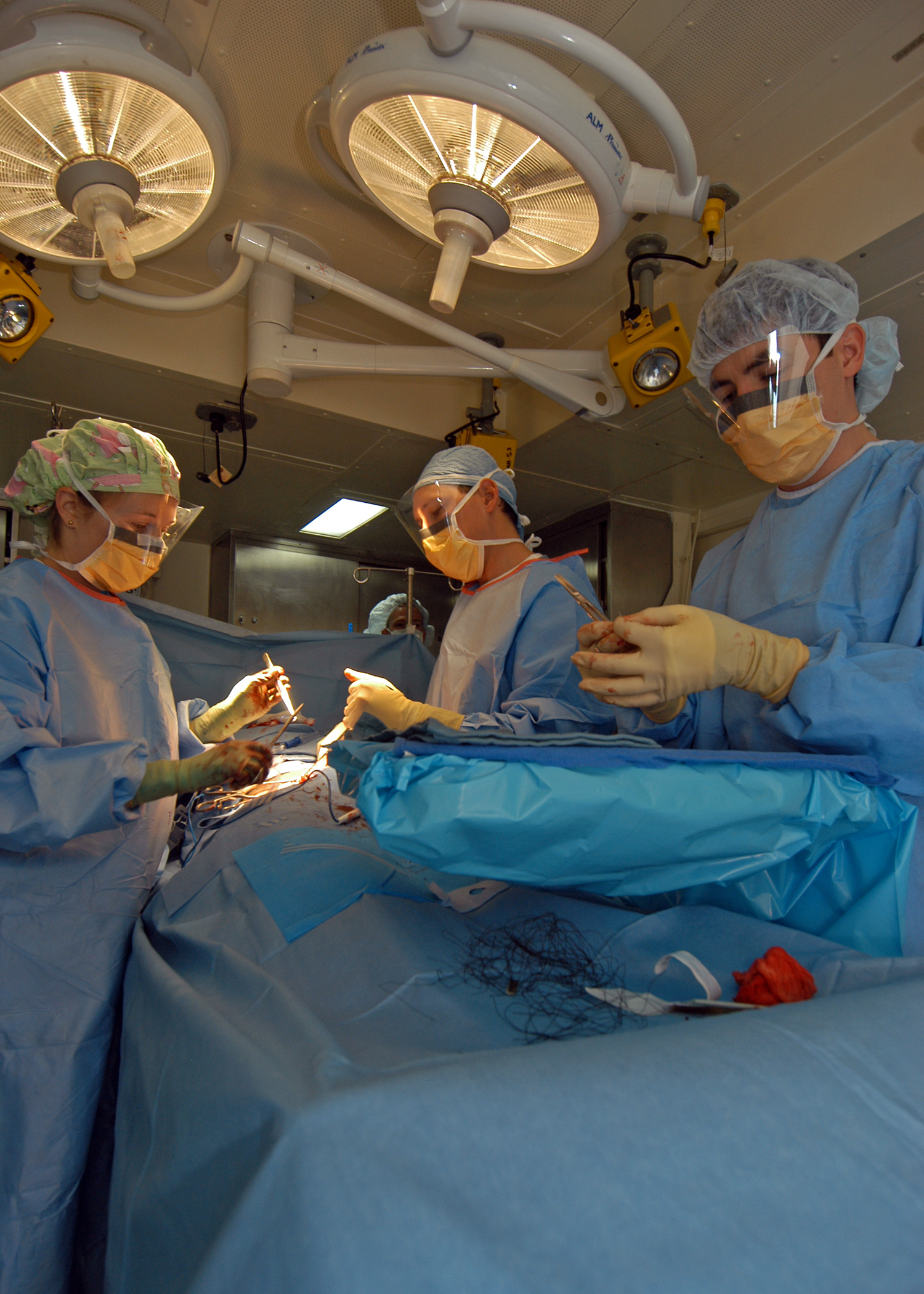
Hernia repair being performed aboard the amphibious assault ship USS Bataan.

=== Truss ===
The benefits of the use of an external device to maintain reduction of the hernia without repairing the underlying defect (such as hernia trusses, trunks, belts, etc.) are unclear.

=== Surgery ===
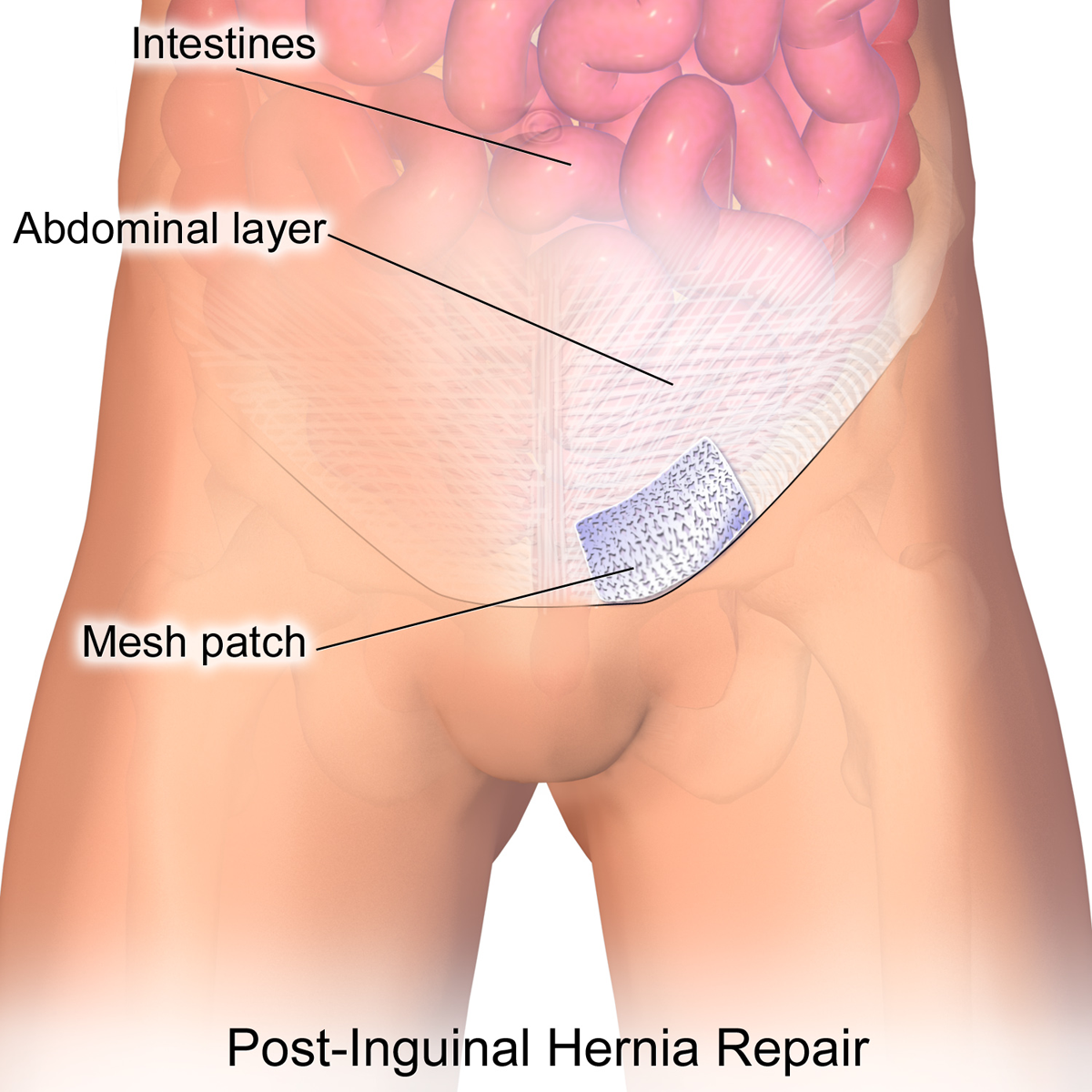
Inguinal hernia repair with mesh diagram

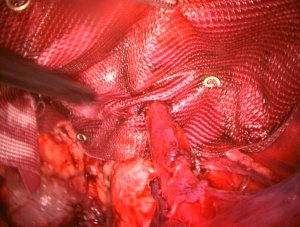
Laparoscopic hernia repair with mesh

Surgery is recommended for some types of hernias to prevent complications such as obstruction of the bowel or strangulation of the tissue, although umbilical hernias and hiatus hernias may be watched, or are treated with medication. Most abdominal hernias can be surgically repaired, but surgery has complications. Prior to surgery patients should be medically optimized receive guidance about changing factors that can be controlled, such as quitting smoking, managing medical conditions like diabetes effectively, and working on losing weight.

Three primary methods can be utilized: open surgery, laparoscopy, or robotic techniques. Fixing an inguinal hernia using laparoscopy causes less pain, speeds up recovery, and shows similar low rates of the hernia coming back compared to the traditional open repair method. However, open surgery can be done sometimes without general anesthesia. Using local anesthesia for open groin hernia repair, particularly in patients with additional health issues, leads to fewer complications and reduced costs. Studies show that compared to regional or general anesthesia, local anesthesia results in less postoperative pain, shorter recovery times, and decreased unplanned overnight stays. However, it might not be enough for repairing large hernias or in patients with abdominal domain loss, where general anesthesia is preferred.

Laparoscopic mesh surgery, as compared to open mesh surgery
Advantages	Disadvantages
Quicker recovery; Less pain during the first few days following the procedure; Fewer postoperative complications such as infections, bleeding and seromas; Lower risk of chronic pain	Needs a surgeon who is highly experienced in inguinal hernia repair (>200 operations/year); Longer operation time; Increased recurrence of primary hernias if a surgeon is not experienced enough

Robot-assisted hernia surgery has also recently gained popularity as safe alternatives to open surgery. Robotic surgery for inguinal hernia repair shows outcomes comparable to laparoscopic surgery. The rates of overall complications, long-lasting postoperative pain, urinary retention, and 30-day re-admission are very similar between these two methods. Just like in other areas of general surgery, it has been noted that robotic surgery for inguinal hernia repair takes more time in the operating room compared to the laparoscopic approach.

Uncomplicated hernias are principally repaired by pushing back, or "reducing", the herniated tissue, and then mending the weakness in muscle tissue (an operation called herniorrhaphy). If complications have occurred, the surgeon will check the viability of the herniated organ and remove part of it if necessary.

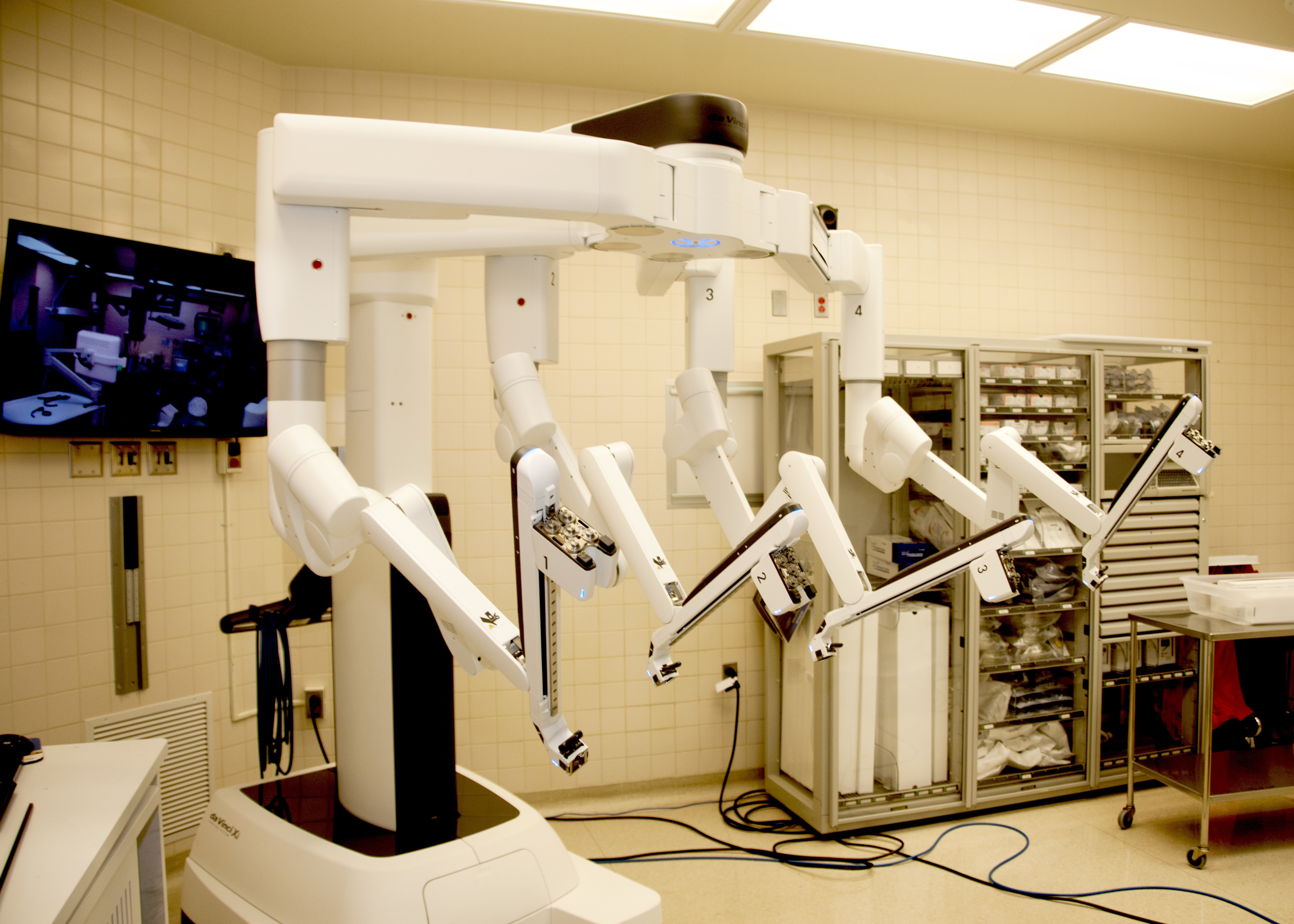
da Vinci Surgical System

Muscle reinforcement techniques often involve synthetic materials (a mesh prosthesis). The mesh is placed either over the defect (anterior repair) or under the defect (posterior repair). At times staples are used to keep the mesh in place. These mesh repair methods are often called "tension free" repairs because, unlike some suture methods (e.g., Shouldice), muscle is not pulled together under tension. However, this widely used terminology is misleading, as there are many tension-free suture methods that do not use mesh (e.g., Desarda, Guarnieri, Lipton-Estrin, etc.).

Evidence suggests that tension-free methods (with or without mesh) often have lower percentage of recurrences and the fastest recovery period compared to tension suture methods. However, the use of prosthetic mesh appears to have a higher likelihood of causing long-term pain and can also lead to infections. Cell-based adjuncts remain under investigation and may alleviate some of these complications.

The frequency of surgical correction ranges from 10 per 100,000 (U.K.) to 28 per 100,000 (U.S.). After elective surgery, the 30-day mortality rate for inguinal or femoral hernia repair stands at 0.1 percent, but it increases to 2.8 to 3.1 percent after urgent surgery. When a bowel resection is part of the hernia repair, the mortality rate is even higher. Older age, femoral hernias, female sex, and urgent repair are identified as other factors linked to a higher risk of mortality.

Post-Operative Complications

Some complications from surgery in order of prevalence include a seroma/hematoma formation, urinary retention, neuralgias, testicular pain/swelling, mesh infection/wound infection, and recurrence. A seroma is often seen after an indirect hernia repair and resolves spontaneously over 4–6 weeks. To prevent a seroma it's important to reduce the amount of cutting around the hernia sac where it's connected to the cord structures. Additionally, securely attaching the hernia sac to the pubic bone and creating small openings in the tissue around a direct hernia can help. In cases of heavy bleeding or extensive cutting, certain surgeons may opt to insert a drain. Urinary retention is often seen in elderly patients, these patients can be catheterized prior to surgery if there is a risk. Other complications may arise post-operatively, including rejection of the mesh that is used to repair the hernia. In the event of a mesh rejection, the mesh will very likely need to be removed. Mesh rejection can be detected by obvious, sometimes localized swelling and pain around the mesh area. Continuous discharge from the scar is likely for a while after the mesh has been removed. A surgically treated hernia can lead to complications such as inguinodynia.

=== Recovery ===
Many patients are managed through day surgery centers and are able to return to work within a week or two, though intense activities are prohibited for a longer period. People who have their hernias repaired with mesh often recover within a month, but pain can last longer. Surgical complications may include pain that lasts more than three months, surgical site infections, nerve and blood vessel injuries, injury to nearby organs, and hernia recurrence. Pain that lasts more than three months occurs in about 10% of people following hernia repair.

== Epidemiology ==
About 27% of males and 3% of females develop a groin hernia at some time in their lives. In 2013 about 25 million people had a hernia. Inguinal, femoral and abdominal hernias resulted in 32,500 deaths globally in 2013 and 50,500 in 1990. Healthcare costs associated with abdominal wall hernias account for an annual expenditure of approximately 2.5 to 3 billion dollars.
