= Kevin Gosling =

Canada's first non-directed living organ donor

Kevin Gosling is the first living Canadian to donate a non-directed live organ to an anonymous organ transplant recipient. The elective surgery was performed on April 19, 2005 at Toronto General Hospital, when the Eastern Ontario native was 46-years-old. At a time when live organ transplant surgeries in Canada only involved donors whose live organ was intentionally directed to the transplant recipient -- a person whose identity is known -- Gosling's push to give a portion of his liver to an unknown person in need sparked the Canadian health care system to allow "non-directed live organ donation" -- the term for people who donate anonymously without a specific recipient in mind -- for organ transplant consideration.
