= Adolph Henke =

German physician and pharmacologist

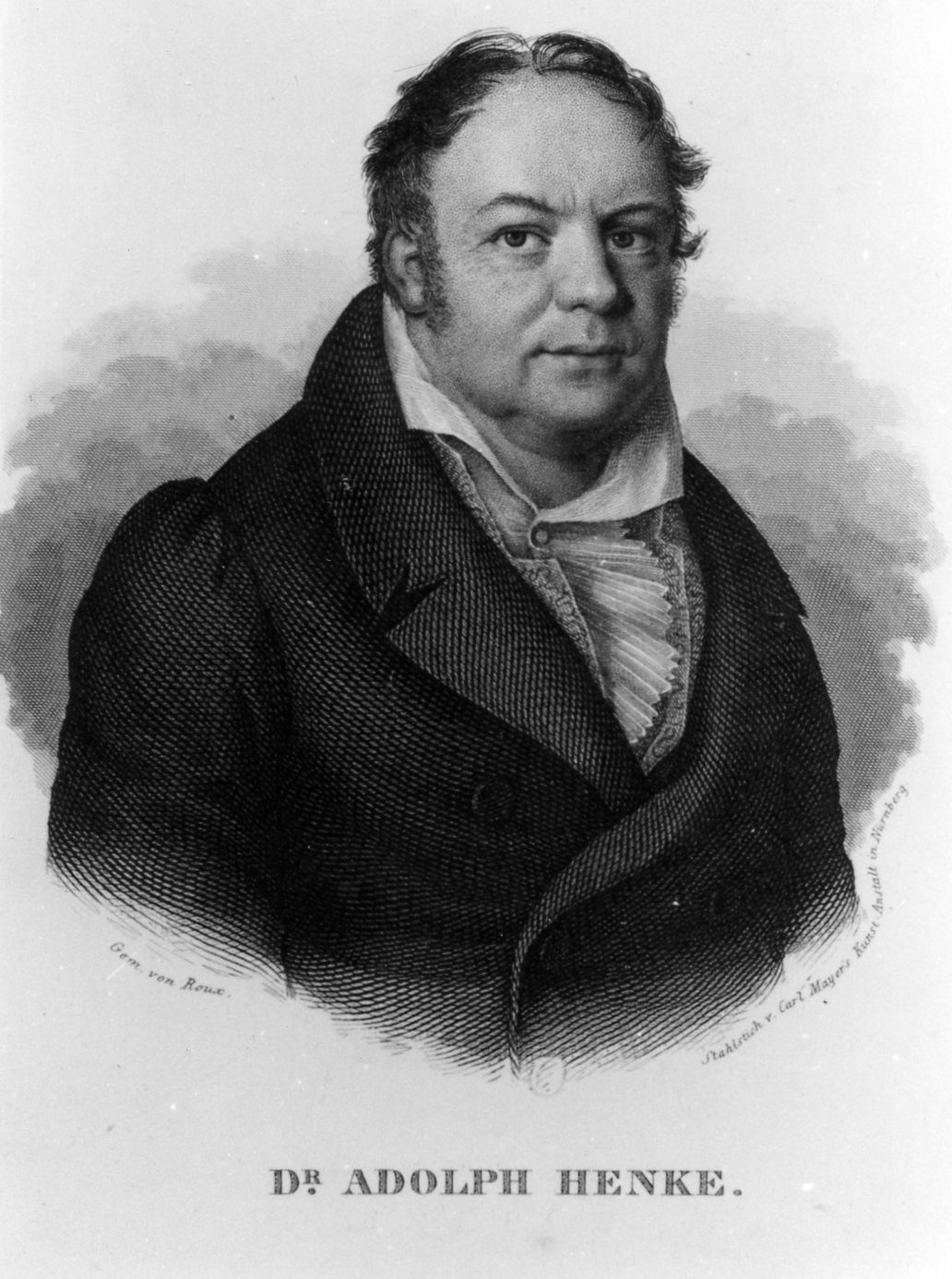
Adolph Henke (1775–1843)

Adolph Christian Heinrich Henke (13 April 1775 in Braunschweig – 8 August 1843) was a German medical doctor and pharmacologist known for his work in medical forensics. He was father-in-law to anatomist Rudolf Wagner (1805–1864).

Following studies at the Collegium Carolinum in Braunschweig, he continued his education at the University of Helmstedt, where one of his instructors was chemist Lorenz von Crell (1744–1816). Afterwards, he studied medicine with surgeon August Gottlieb Richter (1742–1812) and obstetrician Friedrich Benjamin Osiander (1759–1822) at the University of Göttingen, subsequently receiving his doctorate in 1799 at Helmstedt.

In 1805 he became an associate professor of medicine at the University of Erlangen, where in 1814, he became a professor of physiology, pathology and state pharmacology.

== Selected writings ==
- Handbuch der allgemeinen Pathologie, 1806 - Textbook of general pathology.
- Handbuch zur Erkenntniss und Heilung der Kinderkrankheiten - Textbook involving knowledge and cure of childhood illnesses, 1809.
- Lehrbuch der gerichtlichen Medicin (numerous editions) - Textbook of forensic medicine.
- Darstellung des Feldzuges der Verbündeten gegen Napoleon im Jahr 1814 I, Feldzug der grosen, der schlesischen und der Nord-Armee in Frankreich, 1814 – Portrayal of the campaign of the allies against Napoleon I in 1814, the Great Campaign, the Silesian and the Northern Army in France.
- Abhandlungen aus dem Gebiete der gerichtlichen Medicin, als Erläuterungen zu dem Lehrbuche der gerichtlichen Medicin, 1815-1834 – Essays from the field of legal medicine as explanations to the textbook of medical forensics.
