= Inguinal hernia surgery =

Medical procedure

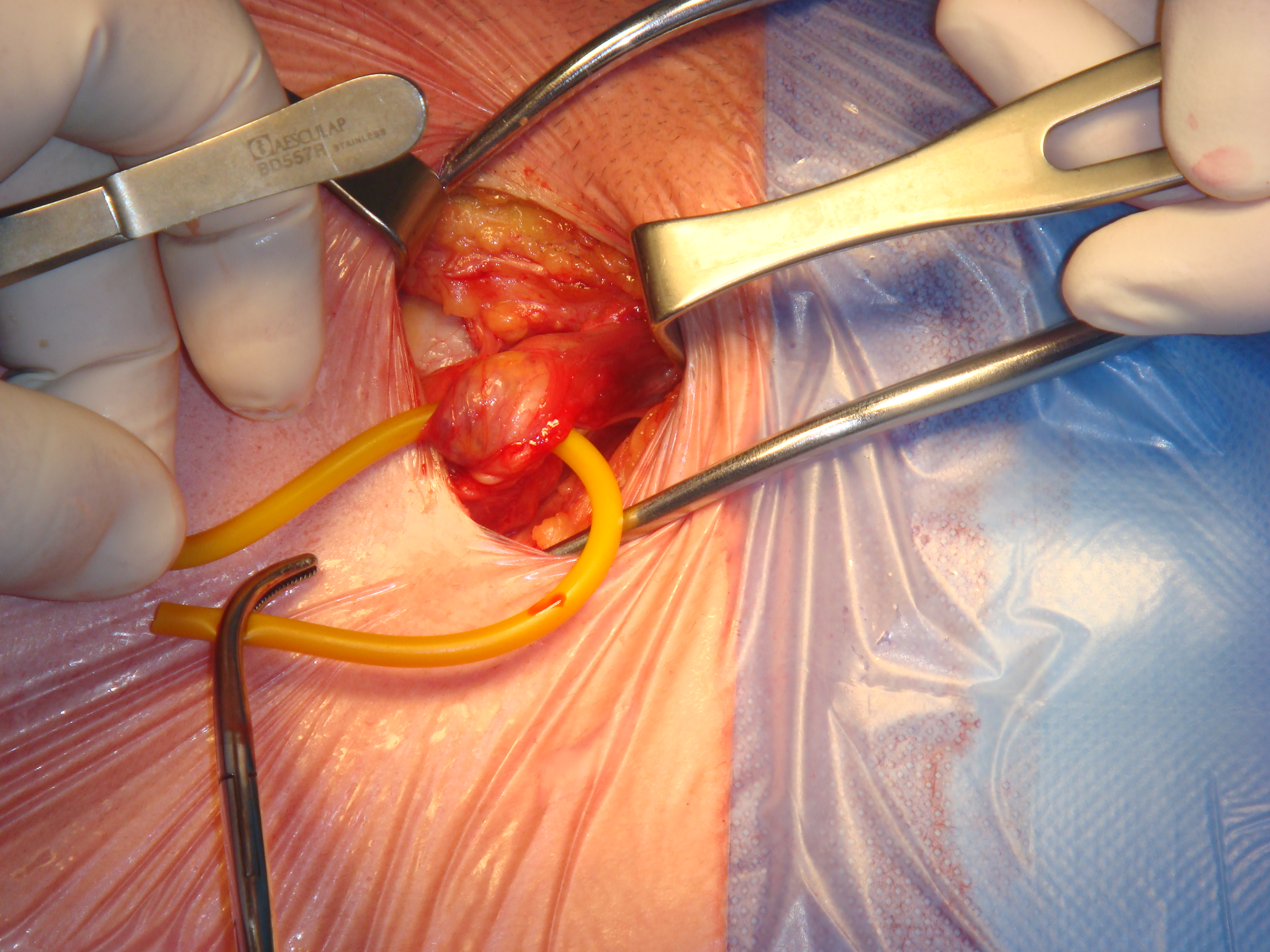
- Open surgical repair of a right inguinal hernia
- Specialty: General surgery

Inguinal hernia surgery is an operation to repair a weakness in the abdominal wall that abnormally allows abdominal contents to slip into a narrow tube called the inguinal canal in the groin region.

There are two different clusters of hernia: groin and ventral (abdominal) wall. Groin hernia includes femoral, obturator, and inguinal. Inguinal hernia is the most common type of hernia and consist of about 75% of all hernia surgery cases in the US. Inguinal hernia, which results from lower abdominal wall weakness or defect, is more common among men with about 90% of total cases. In the inguinal hernia, fatty tissue or a part of the small intestine gets inserted into the inguinal canal. Other structures that are uncommon but may get stuck in inguinal hernia can be the appendix, caecum, and transverse colon. Hernias can be asymptomatic, incarcerated, or strangled. Incarcerated hernia leads to impairment of intestinal flow, and strangled hernia obstructs blood flow in addition to intestinal flow.

Inguinal hernia can make a small lump in the groin region which can be detected during a physical exam and verified by imaging techniques such as computed tomography (CT). This lump can disappear by lying down and reappear through physical activities, laughing, crying, or forceful bowel movement. Other symptoms can include pain around the groin, an increase in the size of the bulge over time, pain while lifting, and a dull aching sensation. In occult (hidden) hernia, the bulge cannot be detected by physical examination and magnetic resonance imaging (MRI) can be more helpful in this situation. Males who have asymptomatic inguinal hernia and pregnant women with uncomplicated inguinal hernia can be observed, but the definitive treatment is mostly surgery.

Surgery remains the ultimate treatment for all types of hernias as they will not get better on their own, however not all require immediate repair. Elective surgery is offered to most patients taking into account their level of pain, discomfort, degree of disruption in normal activity, as well as their overall level of health. Emergency surgery is typically reserved for patients with life-threatening complications of inguinal hernias such as incarceration and strangulation. Incarceration occurs when intra-abdominal fat or small intestine becomes stuck within the canal and cannot slide back into the abdominal cavity either on its own or with manual maneuvers. Left untreated, incarceration may progress to bowel strangulation as a result of restricted blood supply to the trapped segment of small intestine causing that portion to die. Successful outcomes of repair are usually measured via rates of hernia recurrence, pain and subsequent quality of life.

Surgical repair of inguinal hernias is one of the most commonly performed operations worldwide and the most commonly performed surgery within the United States. A combined 20 million cases of both inguinal and femoral hernia repair are performed every year around the world with 800,000 cases in the US as of 2003. The UK reports around 70,000 cases performed every year. Groin hernias account for almost 75% of all abdominal wall hernias with the lifetime risk of an inguinal hernia in men and women being 27% and 3% respectively. Men account for nearly 90% of all repairs performed and have a bimodal incidence of inguinal hernias peaking at 1 year of age and again in those over the age of 40. Although women account for roughly 70% of femoral hernia repairs, indirect inguinal hernias are still the most common subtype of groin hernia in both males and females.

Inguinal hernia surgery is also one of the most common surgical procedures, with an estimated incidence of 0.8-2% and increasing up to 20% in preterm children.

== Indications for surgery ==
Surgical intervention for hernias is guided by various factors, including the severity of symptoms, hernia type, medical history, hernia size, bowel incarceration (bowel can no longer return to the abdomen) and the overall general health of the person.

=== Non-urgent repair ===
Elective surgery is planned in order to help relieve symptoms, respect the person's preference, and prevent future complications that may require emergency surgery.

Surgery is offered to the majority of people who:

- have symptoms that interfere with their normal level of activity.
- have hernias that become increasingly difficult to reduce.
- are female as it is often difficult to classify the subtype of hernia based on an exam alone.

Symptomatic hernias tend to cause pain or discomfort within the groin region that may increase with exertion and improve with rest. A swollen scrotum within males may coincide with persistent feelings of heaviness or generalized lower abdominal discomfort. The sensation of groin pressure tends to be most prominent at the end of the day as well as after strenuous activities. Changes in sensation may be experienced along the scrotum and inner thigh.

=== Urgent repair ===
A hernia in which the small intestine has become incarcerated or strangulated constitutes a surgical emergency. Symptoms include:

- Fever
- Nausea and vomiting
- Extreme pain in the area of the hernia
- Warm hernia bulge with surrounding skin redness
- Can no longer pass gas or stool

Surgical repair within 6 hours of the above symptoms may be able to save the strangulated portion of the intestine.

Although pediatric inguinal hernias sometimes present asymptomatically, surgical repair is still the standard of care to prevent hernia incarceration, which for children who are born with hernias has a risk of 12% in full-term children and 39% in preterm children. In preterm neonates, the timing for intervention appears to be of utter importance as surgical hernia repair after neonatal intensive care unit (NICU) discharge might decrease recurrence and anesthesia-induced respiratory difficulties compared to surgery before NICU discharge.

== Contraindications to surgery ==
The person with the hernia should be given an opportunity to participate in the shared decision-making with their physicians as almost all procedures carry significant risks. The benefits of inguinal hernia repair can become overshadowed by risks such that elective repair is no longer in a person's best interest. Such cases include:

- People with unstable medical conditions
- Repair using mesh is withheld if a person has an active infection within the groin or within the blood stream
- Elective repair is delayed in pregnant women until 4 weeks after delivery

Additionally, certain medical conditions can prevent people from being candidates for laparoscopic approaches to repair. Examples of such include:

- People who are unable to undergo general anesthesia
- Prior major open abdominal surgery
- People who have ascites
- Previous radiation therapy to the pelvis
- A complex hernia

== Surgical approaches ==
Techniques to repair inguinal hernias fall into two broad categories termed "open" and "laparoscopic". Surgeons tailor their approach by taking into account factors such as their own experience with either techniques, the features of the hernia itself, and the person's anesthetic needs.

The cost associated with either approach varies widely across regions, but updated guidelines published by the International Endohernia Society (IES) cast doubt on the comprehensiveness of cost comparison studies due in part to the complexity inherent in calculating costs across institutions. The IES asserts that hospital and societal costs are lower for laparoscopic repairs as compared to open approaches. They recommend the routine use of reusable instruments as well as improving the proficiency of surgeons to help further decrease costs as well as time spent in the OR. However, as an example, the UK's National Health Service spends £56 million a year in repairing inguinal hernias, 96% of which were repaired via the open mesh approach while only 4% were done laparoscopically.

=== Open hernia repair ===
All techniques involve an approximate 10-cm incision in the groin. Once exposed, the hernia sac is returned to the abdominal cavity or excised and the abdominal wall is very often reinforced with mesh. There are many techniques that do not utilize mesh and have their own situations where they are preferable.

Open repairs are classified via whether prosthetic mesh is utilized or whether the patient's own tissue is used to repair the weakness. Prosthetic repairs enable surgeons to repair a hernia without causing undue tension in the surrounding tissues while reinforcing the abdominal wall. Repairs with undue tension have been shown to increase the likelihood that the hernia will recur. Repairs not using prosthetic mesh are preferable options in patients with an above-average risk of infection such as cases where the bowel has become strangulated (blood supply lost due to constriction).

One large benefit of this approach lies in its ability to tailor anesthesia to a person's needs. People can be administered local anesthesia, a spinal block, as well as general anesthesia. Local anesthesia has been shown to cause less pain after surgery, shorten operating times, shorten recovery times as well as decrease the need to return to the hospital. However, people who undergo general anesthesia tend to be able to go home faster and experience fewer complications. The European Hernia Society recommends the use of local anesthesia particularly for people with ongoing medical conditions.

==== Open mesh repairs ====
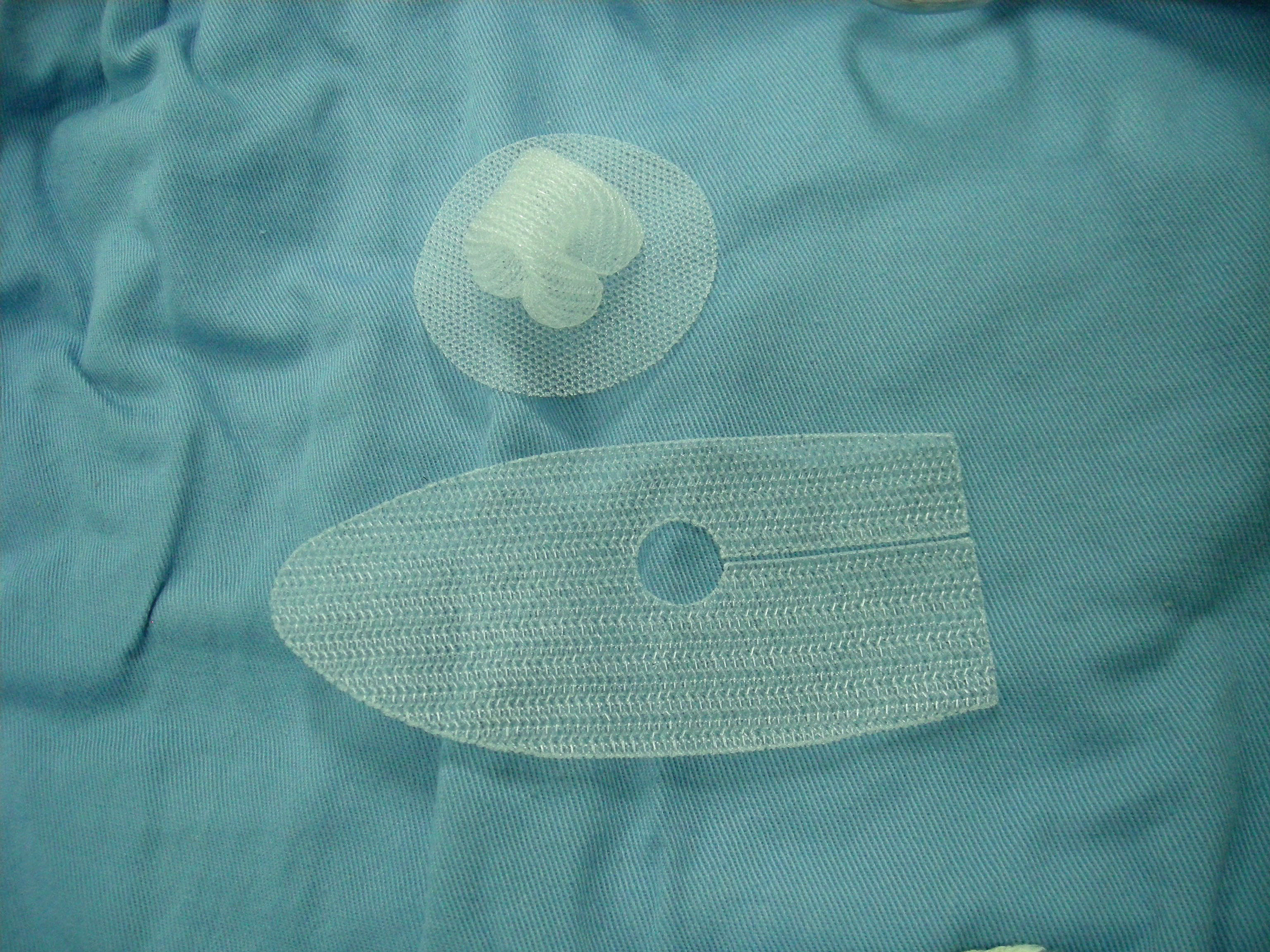
Polypropylene mesh used for inguinal hernia surgery

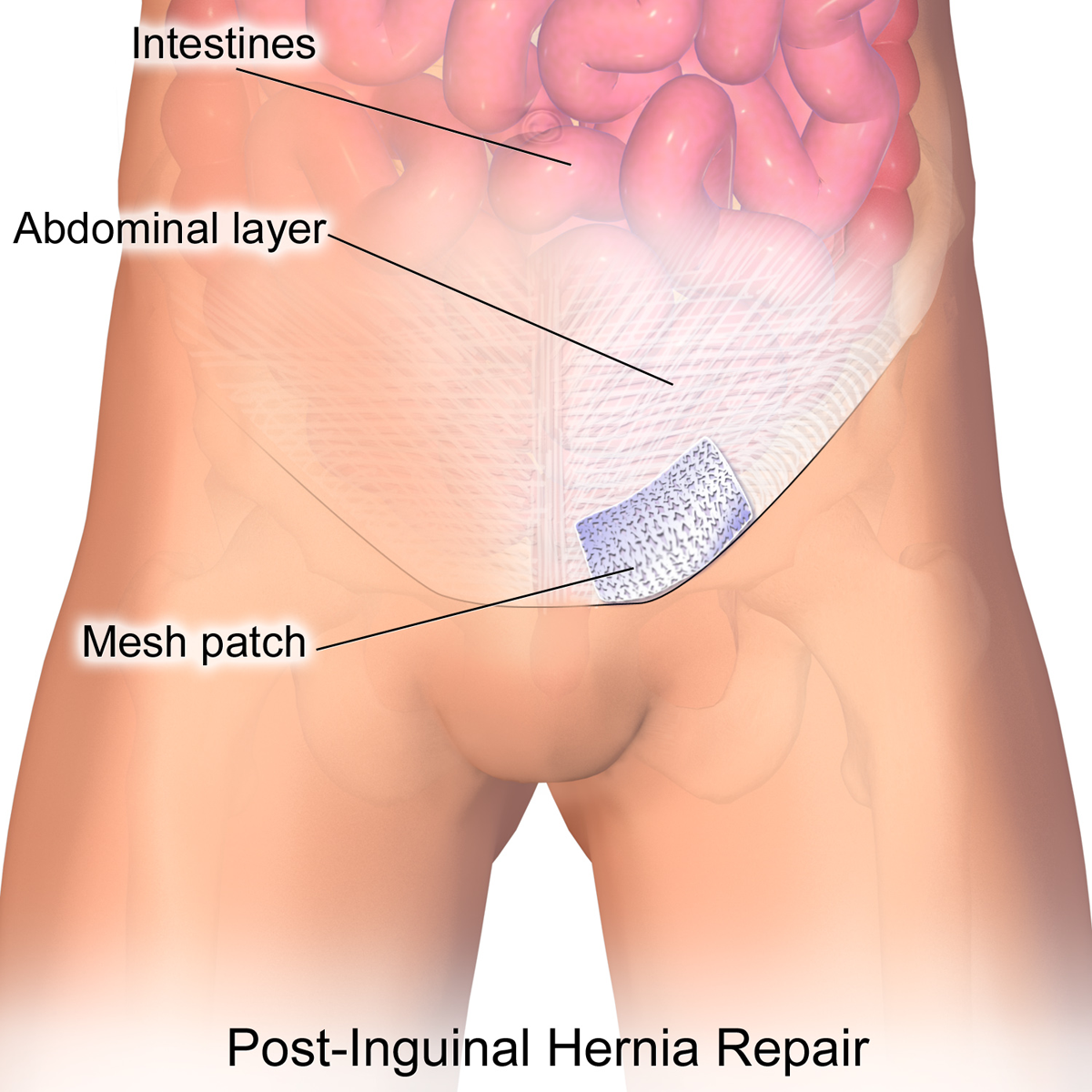
Inguinal Hernia Patch. Animation in the reference.

Repairs that utilize mesh are usually the first recommendation for the vast majority of patients including those that undergo laparoscopic repair. Procedures that employ mesh are the most commonly performed as they have been able to demonstrate better results compared to non-mesh repairs. Approaches utilizing mesh have been able to demonstrate faster return to usual activity, lower rates of persistent pain, shorter hospital stays, and a lower likelihood that the hernia will recur.

Options for mesh include either synthetic or biologic. Synthetic mesh provides the option of using "heavyweight" as well as "lightweight" variations according to the diameter and number of mesh fibers. Lightweight mesh has been shown to have fewer complications related to the mesh itself than its heavyweight counterparts. It was additionally correlated with lower rates of chronic pain while sharing the same rates of hernia recurrence as compared to heavyweight options. This has led to the adoption of lightweight mesh for minimizing the chance of chronic pain after surgery. Biologic mesh is indicated in cases where the risk of infection is a major concern such as cases in which the bowel has become strangulated. They tend to have lower tensile strength than their synthetic counterparts lending them to higher rates of mesh rupture.

Biomeshes are increasingly popular since their first use in 1999 and their subsequent introduction to the market in 2003. Some have a similar price to high end synthetic meshes. They can be produced from absorbable, animal-sourced extra cellular matrix, or by other means. Synthetic absorbable meshes are also available.

Meshes made of mosquito net cloth, in copolymer of polyethylene and polypropylene have been used for low-income patients in rural India and Ghana. Each piece costs $0.01, 3700 times cheaper than an equivalent commercial mesh. They give results identical to commercial meshes in terms of infection and recurrence rate at 5 years.

===== Lichtenstein technique =====
The Lichtenstein tension-free repair has persisted as one of the most commonly performed procedures in the world. The European Hernia Society recommends that in cases where an open approach is indicated, the Lichtenstein technique be utilized as the preferred method. Recent studies have indicated that mesh attachment with the use of adhesive glue is faster and less likely to cause post-op pain as compared to attachment via suture material.

===== Plug and patch technique =====
The plug and patch tension-free technique has fallen out of favor due to higher rates of mesh shift along with its tendency to irritate surrounding tissue. This has led to the European Hernia Society recommending that the technique not be used in most cases.

===== Other open mesh repair techniques =====
A variety of other tension-free techniques have been developed and include:

- Prolene mesh system (PHS)
- Kugel (preperitoneal repair)
- Stoppa
- Trabucco (Hertra mesh)
- Wantz
- Rutkow/Robbins
- Modified APP

==== Open non-mesh repairs ====
Techniques in which mesh is not used are referred to as tissue repair technique, suture technique, and tension technique. All involve bringing together the tissue with sutures and are a viable alternative when mesh placement is contraindicated. Such situations are most commonly due to concerns of contamination in cases where there are infections of the groin, strangulation or perforation of the bowel.

===== Shouldice technique =====
The Shouldice technique is the most effective non-mesh repair thus making it one of the most commonly utilized methods. Numerous studies have been able to validate the conclusion that patients have lower rates of hernia recurrence with the Shouldice technique as compared to other non-mesh repair techniques. However this method frequently experiences longer procedure times and length of hospital stay. Despite being the superior non-mesh technique, the Shouldice method results much higher rates of hernia recurrence in patients when compared to repairs that utilize mesh.

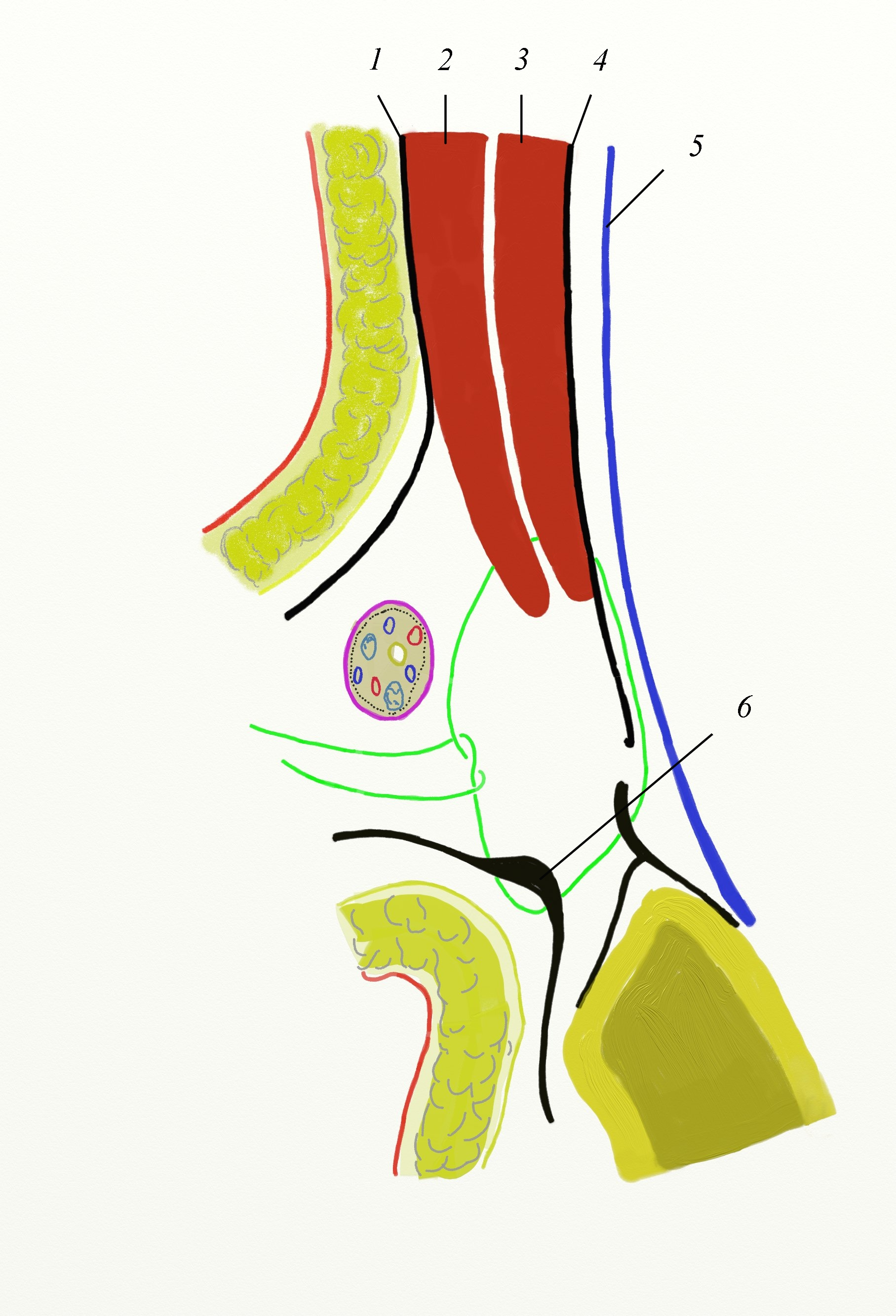
Bassini technique, first suture. 1. Aponeurosis musculi obliq. ext.; 2. Musculus obliquus internus; 3. Musculus transversalis; 4. Fascia transversalis; 5. Peritoneum; 6. Ligamentum inguinale.

===== Bassini technique =====
The Bassini technique, described by Edoardo Bassini in the 1880s, was the first efficient inguinal hernia repair. In this technique, the conjoint tendon (formed by the distal ends of the transversus abdominis and internal oblique muscles) is approximated to the inguinal ligament and closed.

===== Other open non-mesh techniques =====
The Shouldice technique was itself an evolution of prior techniques that had greatly advanced the field of inguinal hernia surgery. Such classic open non-mesh repairs include:

- McVay technique
- Halsted
- Maloney darn
- Plication darn
- Desarda technique A 1–2 cm strip of the external oblique aponeurosis is stitched below to the inguinal ligament and above to the muscle arch without disturbing its continuity at either end. This gives immediate protection, so no restrictions on activities are required. The procedures results in very low recurrence and complication rates.

=== Laparoscopic repair ===
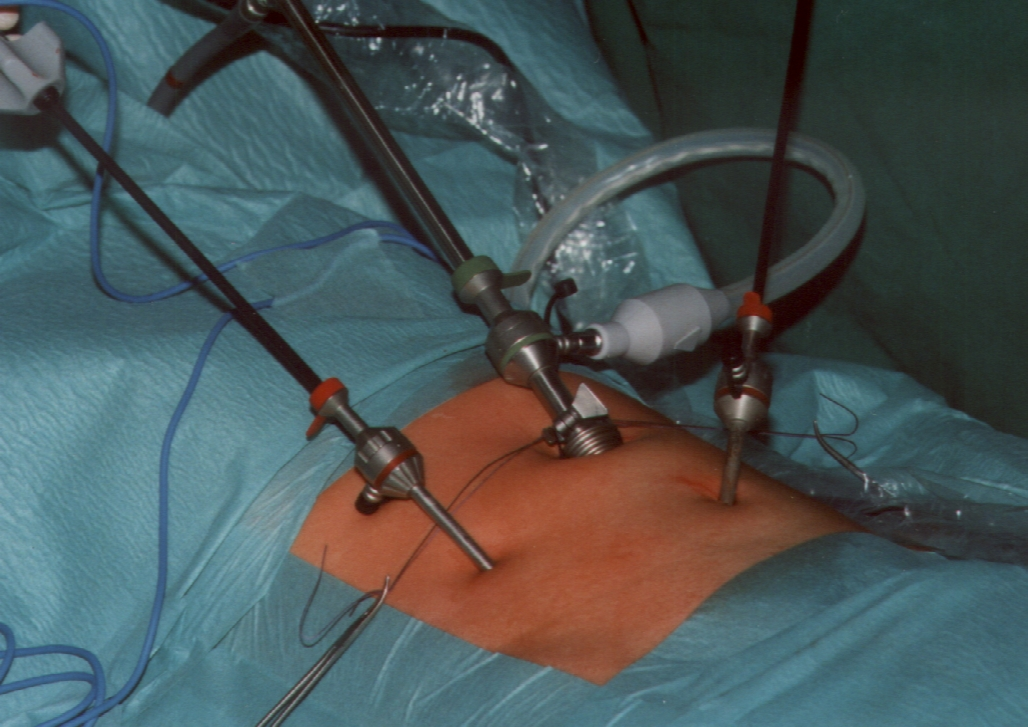
Port sites for inguinal hernia repair

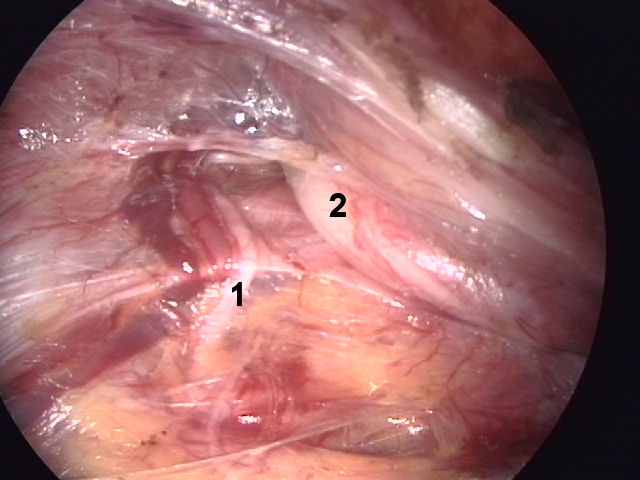
Intraoperative view by TEP Operation. 1. Genital ramus of genitofemoral nerve. 2. Preperitoneal lipom and spermatic cord.

There are two main methods of laparoscopic repair: transabdominal preperitoneal (TAPP) and totally extra-peritoneal (TEP) repair, and these have been demenstrated to yield similar outcomes. When performed by a surgeon experienced in hernia repair, laparoscopic repair causes fewer complications than Lichtenstein, particularly less chronic pain. However, if the surgeon is experienced in general laparoscopic surgery but not in the specific subject of laparoscopic hernia surgery, laparoscopic repair is not advised as it causes more recurrence risk than Lichtenstein while also presenting risks of serious complications, as organ injury. All that said, many surgeons are shifting to using laparoscopic techniques as they require smaller incisions, and result in less bleeding, lower infection rates, faster recovery, shorter hospitalization periods, and reduced chronic pain.

Laparoscopic mesh surgery, as compared to open mesh surgery
Advantages	Disadvantages
Quicker recovery; Less pain during the first few days following the procedure; Fewer postoperative complications such as infections, bleeding and seromas; Lower risk of chronic pain	Needs a surgeon who is highly experienced in inguinal hernia repair (>200 operations/year); Longer operation time; Increased recurrence of primary hernias if a surgeon is not experienced enough

Recurrence rates are identical when laparoscopy is performed by an experienced surgeon. When performed by a surgeon less experienced in inguinal hernia lap repair, recurrence is larger than after Lichtenstein.

==== Robotic surgery ====
Robot assisted repair of inguinal hernias has demonstrated safety and efficacy in surgeries repairing inguinal hernias that present on both sides of the pubic bone (bilateral) as well as inguinal hernias that present on one side (unilateral). In comparing robot assisted repair of inguinal hernias to traditional laparoscopic techniques, robot assisted surgeries repairing inguinal hernias have longer operating times and can be more costly. However, measures of safety, complication rates, and readmission rates did not significantly differ between robot assisted repair and traditional laparoscopic repair.

== Non-surgical management ==
The potential benefits and risks of different approaches to inguinal hernia. Graphic from NHS England decision aid.

Studies have demonstrated that men whose hernias cause little to no symptoms can safely continue to delay surgery until a time that is most convenient for patients and their healthcare team. Research shows that the risk of inguinal hernia complications remains under 1% within the population. Watchful waiting requires that patients maintain a close follow-up schedule with providers to monitor the course of their hernia for any changes in symptoms and can be safely offered for up to 2 years.

Patients who do elect watchful waiting eventually undergo repair within five years as 25% will experience a progression of symptoms such as worsening of pain. Elective repair discussions should be revisited if patients begin to avoid aspects of their normal routine due to their hernia. After 1 year it is estimated that 16% of patients who initially opted for watchful waiting will eventually undergo surgery. Furthermore, 54% and 72% will undergo repair at 5-year and 7.5-year marks respectively.

The use of a truss is an additional non-surgical option for men. It resembles a jock-strap that utilizes a pad to exert pressure at the site of the hernia in order prevent excursion of the hernia sack. It has little evidence to support its routine use and has not been shown to prevent complications such as incarceration (bowel can no longer slide back into abdomen) or strangulation of bowel (constriction causing loss of blood supply). However some patients do report a soothing of symptoms when utilized.

== Complications and prognosis ==
Most hernia repairs are done under general anaesthetic, which carries some risks.

Inguinal hernia repair complications are unusual, and the procedure as a whole proves to be relatively safe for the majority of patients. Risks inherent in almost all surgical procedures include:

- bleeding
- infection
- fluid collections
- damage to surrounding structures such as blood vessels, nerves, or the bladder
- urinary retention requiring a catheter
- risks of general anaesthetic (used for laparoscopic hernia repair and most open hernia repairs)

Risks that are specific to inguinal hernia repairs include such things as:

- recurrence of the hernia
- impairment of sexual activity, such as genital or ejaculatory pain
- in males, injury to the tube that conveys sperm from the testicle to the penis
- in males, bruising and swelling of the scrotum
- chronic regional pain (also known as post-herniorrhaphy inguinodynia, or chronic postoperative inguinal pain)

=== Post-herniorraphy pain syndrome ===
Post-herniorrhaphy inguinodynia is a condition where 10-12% of patients experience severe pain after inguinal hernia repair, due to a complex combination of different forms of pain signals. It can occur with any inguinal hernia repair technique, and if unresponsive to pain medications, further surgical intervention is often required. Removal of the implanted mesh, in combination with bisection of regional nerves, is commonly performed to address such cases. There remains ongoing discussion amongst surgeons regarding the utility of planned resections of regional nerves as an attempt to prevent its occurrence.

=== Mortality rates ===
Mortality rates for non-urgent, elective procedures was demonstrated as 0.1%, and around 3% for procedures performed urgently. Other than urgent repair, risk factors that were also associated with increased mortality included being female, requiring a femoral hernia repair, and older age.

== Follow-up ==
Upon awakening from anesthesia, patients are monitored for their ability to drink fluids, produce urine, as well as their ability to walk after surgery. Most patients are then able to return home once those conditions are met. It is not uncommon for patients to experience residual soreness for a couple of days after surgery. Patients are encouraged to make strong efforts in getting up and walking around the day after surgery. Most patients can resume their normal routine of daily living within the week such as driving, showering, light lifting, as well as sexual activity. Long work absences are rarely necessary and length of sick days tend to be dictated by respective employment policies.

In general, it is not recommended to administer antibiotics as prophylaxis after elective inguinal hernia repair. However, the rate of wound infection determines the appropriate use of the antibiotics.

Post-op development of any of the following should warrant timely reporting via phone:

- fever greater than 39C/101F
- progressive swelling of the surgical site
- severe pain
- recurring nausea or vomiting
- worsening redness around incisions
- drainage of pus from incisions
- difficulty or lack of producing urine
- new-onset shortness of breath

== Prevention and screening ==
Most indirect inguinal hernias in the abdominal wall are not preventable. Direct inguinal hernias may be prevented by maintaining a healthy weight, refraining from smoking, preventing straining during bowel movements, and maintaining proper lifting techniques when heavy lifting. There is no evidence that indicates physicians should routinely screen for asymptomatic inguinal hernias during patient visits.
