= Georg Gottlob Richter =

18th-century German academic

Georg Richter
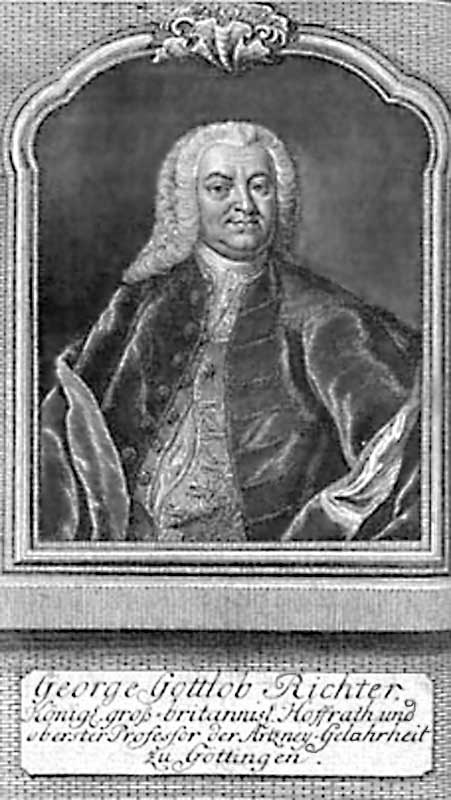
- Georg Gottlob Richter (1694-1773)
- Born: 4 February 1694; Schneeberg, Electorate of Saxony
- Died: 28 May 1773 (aged 79); Göttingen, Duchy of Brunswick-Lüneburg
- Education: University of Kiel
- Scientific career
- Fields: Physician, philosopher, and philologist
- Workplaces: University of Göttingen
- Doctoral advisor: Johann Ludwig Hannemann
- Other academic advisors: Herman Boerhaave
- Doctoral students: August Gottlieb Richter

Notes
- He is the uncle of August Gottlieb Richter.

Georg Gottlob Richter (4 February 1694 – 28 May 1773) was a professor of medicine, philosophy, and philology.

== Education ==
Before receiving his MD degree, Richter spent a year (1718) in Leiden listening to the lectures of Herman Boerhaave. He then obtained his MD, under Johann Ludwig Hannemann at the University of Kiel in 1720.

== Career ==
He occupied first chair of medicine at the University of Göttingen. Richter wrote a text on dietetics and numerous dissertations on medical theory and practice.

== Works ==
- Lebensordnung für Gesunde und Kranke . Pfähler, Heidelberg 1786 Digital edition by the University and State Library Düsseldorf
