= Truss (medicine) =

Surgical appliance, usually for hernia patients

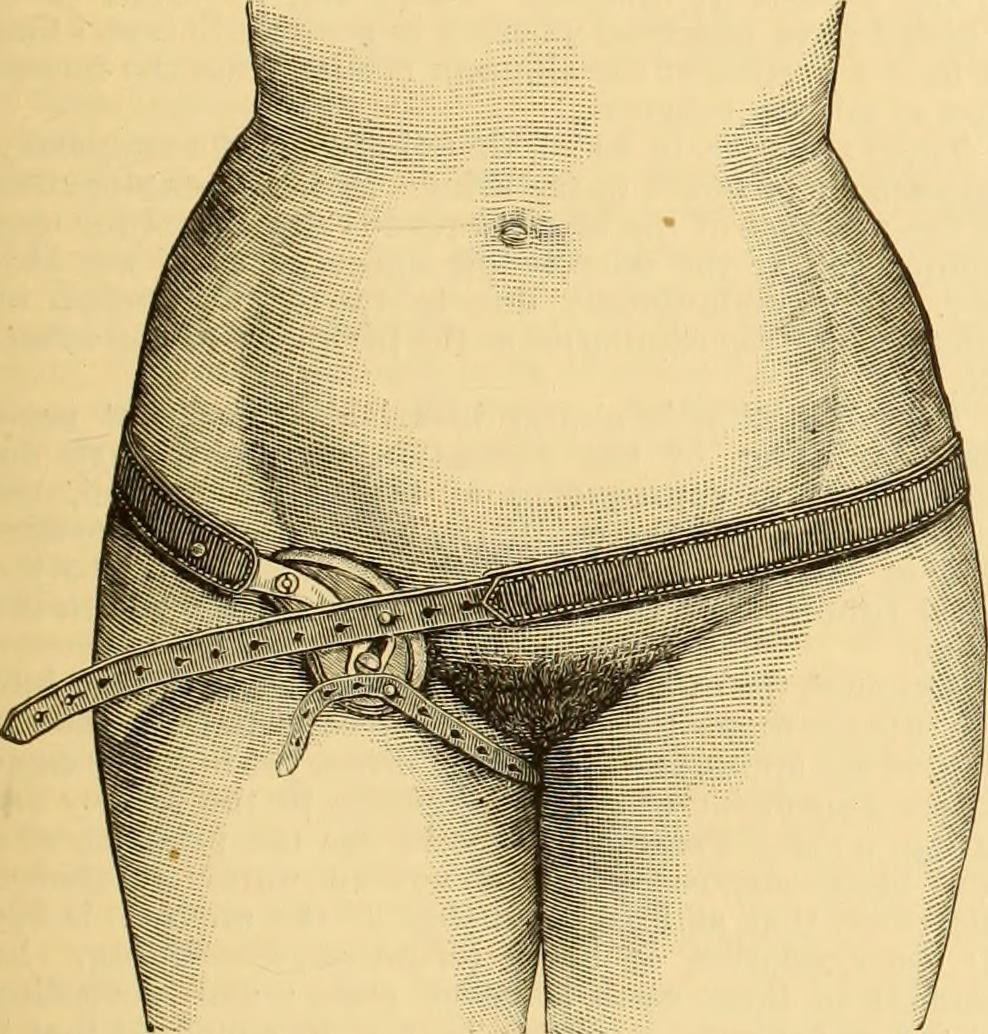
Truss pad

In medicine, a truss is a kind of surgical appliance, particularly one used for hernia patients. A truss provides support for the herniated area, using a pad and belt arrangement to hold it in the correct position. It is put on before moving from bed.

Of historical interest, a variety of trusses are listed in the Snowden & Brother's catalog of the American Civil War era.

Early versions of the hernia truss were daunting contraptions made from leather and steel with metal springs. The 19th century Eggleston's Truss from Chicago was described as follows:

"Eggleston's Truss has a pad different from all others. It is cup-shaped, with a self-adjusting ball in the centre, and adapts itself to all positions of the body, while the ball in the cup presses back the intestines just as a person does with the finger. With light pressure the hernia is held securely day and night, and a radical cure is certain. It is easy, durable and cheap."

Later developments resulted in the Cluthe truss, described in Cluthe's Advice to the Ruptured, first published in 1912. This book also describes dozens of hernia cases which appeared to be cured by this relatively primitive truss. Such testimonials are no longer considered to be scientific evidence.

Currently most doctors and surgeons do not prescribe trusses. Even some of today's trusses use metal springs to apply pressure to the hernia, via a pad which can be quite hard, and usually bulges into the hernia. This inward bulging prevents the edges of the hernia from coming together and could, in theory, enlarge the hernia. Many trusses also do not fit well. It is difficult to design a truss which keeps the pad permanently in contact with the hernia. Unless a truss can achieve this purpose, the hernia may continue to enlarge.

External devices such as a truss to maintain reduction of the hernia without repairing the underlying defect can be used to avoid surgical risks, mainly chronic pain risk.
