= Johann Ludwig Hannemann =

German professor of medicine (1640–1724)

- Born: 25 October 1640; Amsterdam, Republic of the United Netherlands
- Died: 25 October 1724 (aged 84); Kiel, Duchy of Holstein
- Known for: Opposing the theory of circulation
- Scientific career
- Fields: Physician and Physicist
- Workplaces: University of Kiel
- Doctoral students: Georg Gottlob Richter

Johann Ludwig Hannemann (25 October 1640 – 25 October 1724) was a professor of medicine who famously opposed the idea of the circulation of the blood. He studied the chemistry of phosphorus, gold, and hematite; wrote articles on metallurgy, botany, theology, and various medical topics. He was an adherent of the views of the ancients and pre-Renaissance alchemists. He trained his medical students according to the schools of Galen, Hippocrates, and Aristotle.

He first studied theology before studying medicine. He is best known for disseminating the Curse of Ham calumny.

In 1675, he became a full professor at the University of Kiel.

He was the doctoral advisor of Georg Gottlob Richter. In 1680, he became a member of Leopoldina.

== Works ==
- Dissertatio physica ostrea Holsatica exhibens (in Latin). Kiel: Barthold Reuther. 1708.
- Dissertatio physica piscem torpedinem ejusque proprietates admirandas exhibens (in Latin). Kiel: Barthold Reuther. 1710.
