= August Gottlieb Richter =

German surgeon (1742–1812)

August Richter
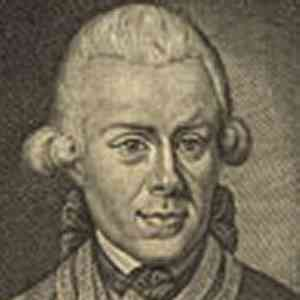
- August Gottlieb Richter (1742-1812)
- Born: 13 April 1742; Zörbig, Electorate of Saxony (Germany)
- Died: 23 July 1812 (aged 70); Göttingen, Kingdom of Westphalia
- Education: University of Göttingen
- Known for: Richter's hernia
- Relatives: Georg Gottlob Richter (uncle)
- Scientific career
- Fields: Surgeon
- Workplaces: University of Göttingen
- Doctoral advisor: Georg Gottlob Richter
- Doctoral students: Justus Ferdinand Christian Loder

August Gottlieb Richter (13 April 1742 – 23 July 1812) was a German surgeon, born in Zörbig, Saxony.

== Biography ==
Richter received his doctorate from the University of Göttingen in 1764, and spent most of his subsequent career in Göttingen as a professor and surgeon. In 1771 he attained the position of professor ordinarius (full professor).

Among his better known writings was a seven volume work on the treatment of wounds, called Anfangsgründe der Wundarzneikunst. From 1771 until 1797, he was editor of the surgical journal, Chirugische Bibliothek. Richter did extensive research in the field of ophthalmology, publishing in 1773, an influential treatise on cataract extraction titled Abhandlung von der Ausziehung des grauen Stars.

The eponymous "Richter's hernia" was first described by him. This disorder is a strangulated hernia in which only part of the circumference of the bowel wall is affected. With this type of hernia, there is an absence of intestinal blockage.

In 1774, Richter was elected a foreign member of the Royal Swedish Academy of Sciences.

== Principal writings ==
- Chirurgische Bibliothek, 15 volumes. Göttingen and Gotha, 1771–1797. Considered to be the first German surgical report journal.
- Abhandlung von den Brüchen, two volumes, 1778, 1779; second edition, 1785. Treatise on fractures.
- Anfangsgründe der Wundarzneikunst, seven volumes, 1792–1804. Medicinische und chirurgische Bemerkungen, vorzüglich im akad. Hospital gesammelt. Volume I, II, 1793, 1813. English translation, Edinburgh, 1794 - Rudiments of wound treatment.
- Specielle Therapie, nine volumes & supplement volumes, Berlin, 1813–1836; published posthumously by his son, Georg August Richter (1778-1832).
