= Claudius Amyand (surgeon) =

French surgeon

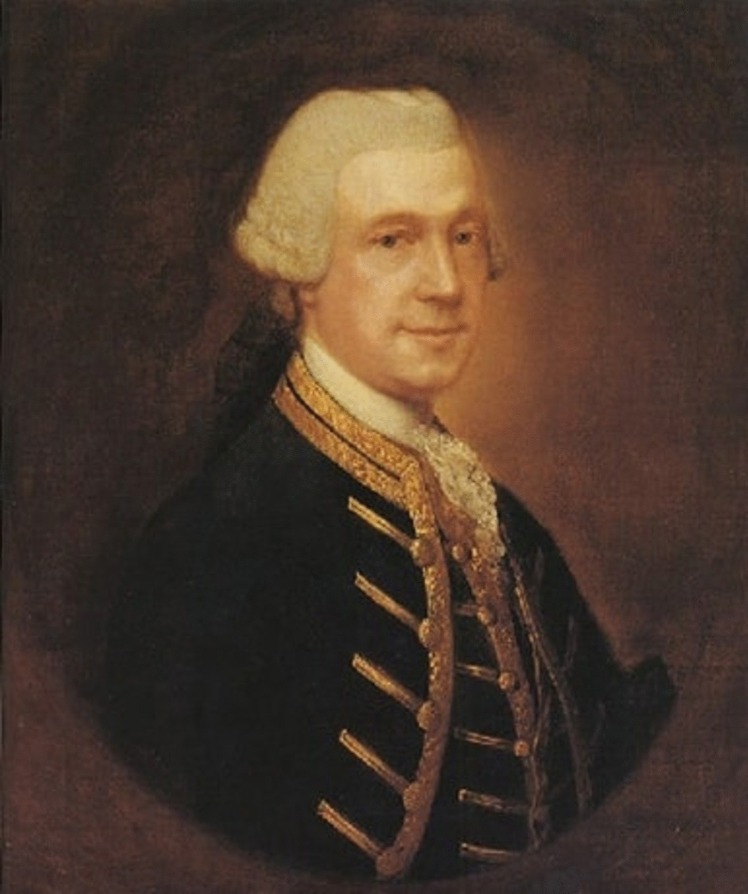
- portrait by Thomas Gainsborough
- Born: Paris
- Died: 1740
- Occupation: Surgeon
- Spouse: Mary Rabache
- Children: 9, including Claudius and George
- Awards: Fellow of the Royal Society

Claudius Amyand (c. 1680 – 6 July 1740) was a French surgeon who performed the first recorded successful appendectomy.

Amyand was born around 1680, the son of Isaac Amyand and Anne Hottot in Mornac, Saintonge, France. As Huguenots, the Amyands fled to England following the revocation of the Edict of Nantes in 1685 and settled in London.

Claudius was naturalised at Westminster on 9 September 1698. He became a surgeon, served with the army during the War of the Spanish Succession, and was appointed Serjeant Surgeon to George I in 1715. He would continue in this post under George II retaining it for the rest of his life. He became first the Warden and later the Master of the Company of Barber-Surgeons. He was first Principal Surgeon to the Westminster Hospital, and founder and first Principal Surgeon to St George's Hospital. On 5 April 1716 he was elected a Fellow of the Royal Society under the name Claude Amyand.

In 1722, he inoculated three of the children of the Prince and Princess of Wales against smallpox, following the introduction of the process into the country from Turkey by Lady Mary Wortley Montagu.

At St George's Hospital, on 6 December 1735, he performed the first recorded successful appendicectomy (which is the surgical removal of the vermiform appendix). The patient was an 11-year boy named Hanvil Anderson who had an inguinal hernia combined with an acutely inflamed appendix. This situation, where the appendix is included in the hernial sac, is known as an Amyand's hernia. Amyand described the operation himself in a paper for the Royal Society.

Amyand's work soon sunk into obscurity, and various candidates were vying for the accolade of having performed the first appendicectomy in the 1880s, unaware that Amyand predated them by 150 years. It was only careful research by John Blair Deaver in the early twentieth century that restored to Amyand the credit he deserved. As biographer P. G. Creese put it: "Claudius Amyand was not a man of genius, but one of solid worth who merits a nod of recognition from medical history, too long denied to him."

Amyand died in London on 7 July 1740, after a fall in Greenwich Park.

== Family ==
He married Mary Rabache at St Benet's, Paul's Wharf on 5 November 1717, and the couple had nine children:

- Claudius Amyand (1718–1774)
- Anne Amyand (1719–1766), married John Porter
- Sir George Amyand, 1st Baronet (1720–1766)
- Wilhelmina Amyand (1722–1744)
- Mary Amyand (1723–1724)
- Mary Catharine Amyand (1726–1771), married Sir Richard Adams, Baron of the Exchequer
- Rev. Thomas Hans Amyand (1728–1762), rector of Hambledon, Buckinghamshire
- Rachel Maria Amyand (1730–1753)
- Judith Amyand (b. 1732), married Rev. Dr Thomas Ashton

The writer H. Rider Haggard was the great great grandson of Thomas Amyand.
