= Petit's hernia =

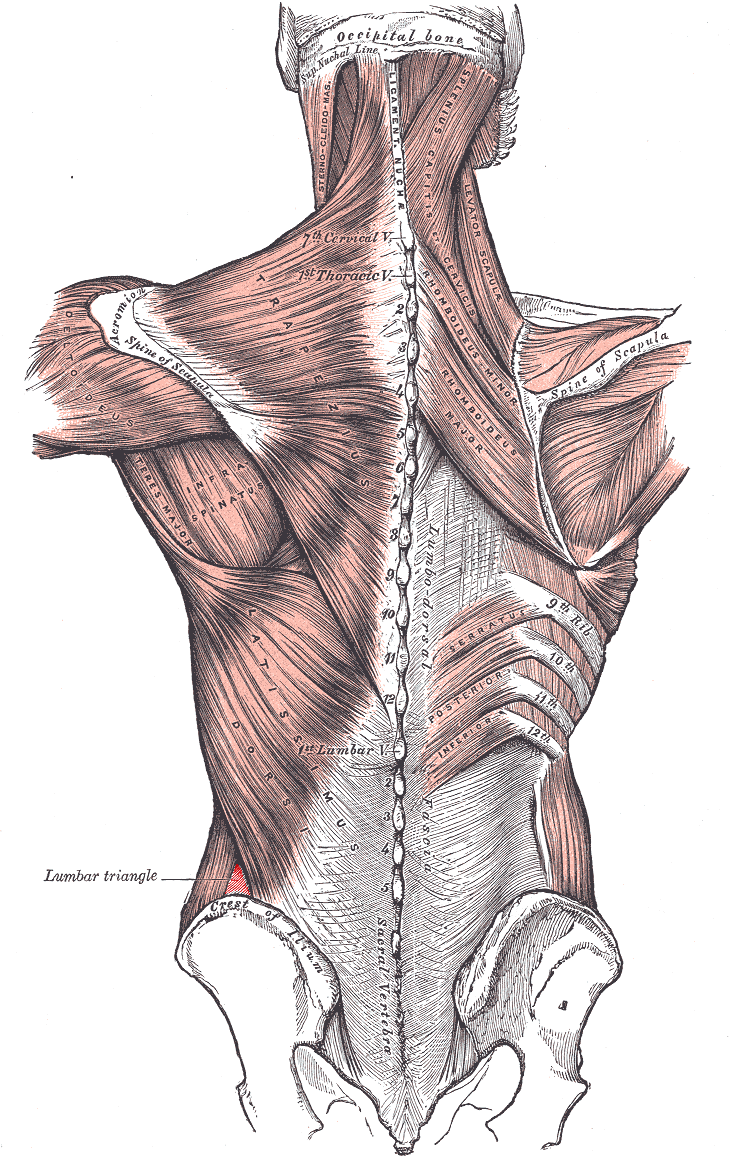
- Posterior view of muscles connecting the upper extremity to the vertebral column. Inferior lumbar triangle is labeled in red at bottom left.
- Specialty: Gastroenterology

Petit's hernia is a hernia that protrudes through the lumbar triangle (aka Petit's triangle). This triangle lies in the posterolateral abdominal wall and is bounded anteriorly by the free margin of external oblique muscle, posteriorly by the latissimus dorsi and inferiorly by the iliac crest. The neck (the spot where the hernia protrudes into the opening) is large, and therefore this hernia has a lower risk of strangulating than some other hernias.

Petit's hernia occurs more often in males than in females and more often on the left side than on the right.

== See also ==
- Grynfeltt-Lesshaft hernia
