= Grynfeltt–Lesshaft hernia =

Herniation of abdominal contents

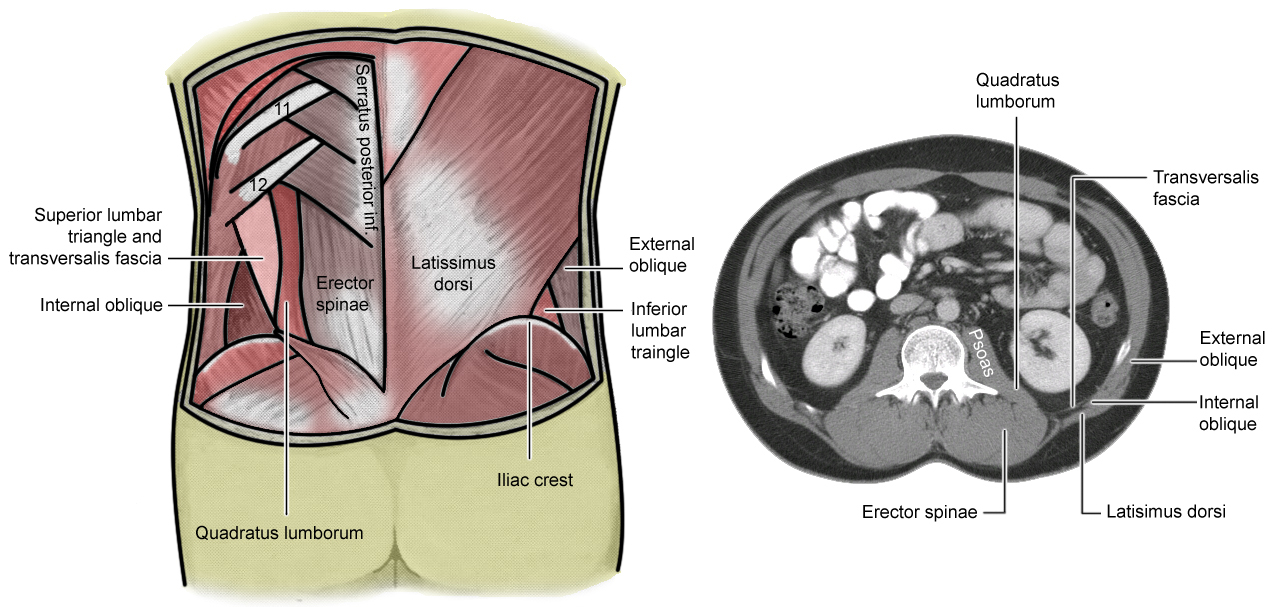
The superior and inferior lumbar triangles with a cross section at the level of the superior lumbar triangle

Grynfeltt–Lesshaft hernia is a herniation of abdominal contents through the back, specifically through the superior lumbar triangle, which is defined by the quadratus lumborum muscle, twelfth rib, and internal oblique muscle.

== History ==
Grynfeltt described a hernia through the superior lumbar triangle in 1866 (Grynfeltt, 1866). In 1870, Lesshaft independently reported a similar case (Lesshaft, 1870).

== See also ==
- Petit's hernia
