= Elective surgery =

Surgical procedure that is planned in advance

Elective surgery or elective procedure is surgery that is scheduled in advance because it does not involve a medical emergency. Semi-elective surgery is a surgery that must be done to preserve the patient's life, but does not need to be performed immediately. Most surgeries are elective, scheduled at a time to suit the surgeon, hospital, and patient.

By contrast, an urgent surgery is one that can wait until the patient is medically stable, but should generally be done within 2 days, and an emergency surgery is one that must be performed without delay; the patient has no choice other than immediate surgery if permanent disability or death is to be avoided. Many surgeries can be performed as either elective or emergency surgeries, depending on the patient's needs.

== Description ==
An elective surgery or elective procedure (from the Latin: eligere, meaning to choose) is a surgery that does not involve a medical emergency and is scheduled in advance. Semi-elective surgery is a surgery that must be done to preserve the patient's life, but does not need to be performed immediately.

== Types ==
=== Elective ===
Most surgical medical treatments are elective, that is, scheduled at a time to suit the surgeon, hospital, and patient. These include inguinal hernia surgery, cataract surgery, mastectomy for breast cancer, and the donation of a kidney by a living donor.

Elective surgeries include all optional surgeries performed for non-medical reasons. This includes cosmetic surgery, such as facelifts, breast implants, liposuction, and breast reduction, which aim to subjectively improve a patient's physical appearance. Another optional surgery is LASIK—currently the top elective surgery in the United States—where a patient weighs the risks against increased quality of life expectations.

=== Semi-elective ===
Urgent surgery refers to procedures that must be performed within hours due to potentially life- or organ-threatening conditions. Semi-elective procedures are typically scheduled within a time frame deemed appropriate for the patient's condition and disease. Removal of a malignancy, for example, is usually scheduled as semi-elective surgery, to be performed within a set number of days or weeks.

== Urgency ==
In a patient with multiple medical conditions, problems classified as needing semi-elective surgeries may be postponed until emergent conditions have been addressed and the patient is medically stable. For example, whenever possible, pregnant women typically postpone all elective and semi-elective procedures until after giving birth.

In some situations, an urgently needed surgery will be postponed briefly to permit even more urgent conditions to be addressed. In other situations, emergency surgery may be performed at the same time as life-saving resuscitation efforts.

Many surgeries can be performed as either elective or emergency surgeries, depending on the patient's needs. A sudden worsening of gallbladder disease may require immediate removal of the gallbladder by emergency surgery, but this surgery is more commonly scheduled in advance. An appendectomy is considered emergency surgery, but depending upon how early the diagnosis was made, the patient may have more time before the appendix risks rupturing or the infection spreads. Also, in certain emergency conditions, even ones like a heart attack or stroke, surgery may or may not need to be utilized.

=== Economic impact of waiting times ===
Economic modelling studies have shown that reducing waiting times for elective surgeries improves patient health outcomes and can be cost-effective or even cost-saving. A systematic review of economic evaluations from high-income countries, including Canada, France, Australia, Spain, and the United States, found that shorter wait times for joint replacement, cataract surgery, bariatric surgery, and transcatheter aortic valve implantation (TAVI) often resulted in lower long-term healthcare costs and better quality-adjusted life years (QALYs). For instance, immediate total knee arthroplasty was associated with savings of over $1,800 and a gain of 0.57 QALYs compared to a two-year delay, while earlier bariatric surgery significantly reduced diabetes and hypertension management costs over a ten-year horizon.

A related review focusing on low- and middle-income countries, specifically Egypt, found that prolonged waiting times are associated with delayed return to work, increased caregiver burden, and greater societal costs, particularly in public healthcare systems with constrained capacity. Investment in early surgical intervention was shown to relieve pressure on health systems, improve population health, and increase economic productivity in resource-limited settings.

== Best practices ==
Preoperative carbohydrates may decrease amount of time spent in hospital recovering.

== Non-elective surgery ==
Non-elective surgeries may be classified as urgent or emergency. An urgent surgery is one that can wait until the patient is medically stable, but should generally be done within 2 days. An emergency surgery is one that must be performed without delay; the patient has no choice other than immediate surgery if permanent disability or death is to be avoided. Urgent surgery is typically performed with 48 hours of diagnosis and emergency surgery is performed as soon as a surgeon is available. A trauma center is a hospital which supports emergency surgery on critically ill patients at the brink of death by ensuring that on a 24/7 basis, a surgeon is always on the premises (or "in-house") to evaluate patients and can take them immediately to the operating room.

== Bibliography ==
- C. Parchment-Smith (2006). Essential Revision Notes for Intercollegiate MRCS: Bk. 1. Knutsford, Cheshire, UK: PasTest, LLC. p. 439. ISBN 1-904627-36-6.
