= Richter's hernia =

Disease of the human digestive system

A Richter's hernia occurs when the antimesenteric wall of the intestine protrudes through a defect in the abdominal wall. This is distinct from other types of abdominal hernias in that only one intestinal wall protrudes through the defect, such that the lumen of the intestine is incompletely contained in the defect, while the rest remains in the peritoneal cavity. If such a herniation becomes necrotic and is subsequently reduced during hernia repair, perforation and peritonitis may result. A Richter's hernia can result in strangulation and necrosis in the absence of intestinal obstruction. It is a relatively rare but dangerous type of hernia.

Richter's hernia have also been noted in laparoscopic port-sites, usually when the fascia is not closed for ports larger than 10mm. A high index of suspicion is required in the post operative period as this sinister problem can closely mimic more benign complications like port-site haematomas.

Treatment is resection and anastomosis. Mortality increases with delay in surgical intervention.
