= Post herniorraphy pain syndrome =

Discomfort lasting over 3 months after surgery of inguinal hernia

Post herniorrhaphy pain syndrome, or inguinodynia is pain or discomfort lasting greater than 3 months after surgery of inguinal hernia. Randomized trials of laparoscopic vs open inguinal hernia repair have demonstrated similar recurrence rates with the use of mesh and have identified that chronic groin pain (>10%) surpasses recurrence (<2%) and is an important measure of success.

Chronic groin pain is potentially disabling with neuralgia, parasthesia, hypoesthesia, and hyperesthesia. Patients may be unable to work, have limited physical & social activities, sleep disturbances, and psychologic distress. The management of inguinodynia is a difficult problem for many surgeons and 5–7% of patients experiencing post-hernia repair groin pain litigate.

== Cause ==
Neuropathic pain is defined as pain in the sensory distribution of an offended nerve. This may be due to preexisting stretch injury or intraoperative nerve injury. It is often described as stabbing and burning. Nociceptive pain includes somatic and visceral pain. Somatic pain may be due to chronic inflammation from tissue injury and is described as gnawing, tender, and pounding. Visceral pain can manifest as testicular and ejaculatory pain which may be associated with mesh ingrowth into spermatic cord structures.

== Prevention ==
=== Nerves management ===
Avoiding nerve entrapment and injury is critical. The current consensus is that routine identification and preservation of nerves is the best method for prevention.

Transection of the nerves routinely is not a recommended strategy, as it can sometimes increase the pain further. It also increases sensory disturbances in the area of distribution of the transected nerve.

No identification at all is the worst, and many surgeons are not making this identification. For example, in daily practice, surgeons identify all three inguinal nerves as three single nerves in less than 40% of the cases, while the literature shows that this identification can be done in 70-90% of the cases. The challenge is that the course of both ilioinguinal and iliohypogastric nerves is found to be consistent with that described in anatomical texts in only 42% of patients. However, these anatomical variations are readily identifiable.

=== Mesh ===
Method of fixation has also been hotly debated with varying results reported with few consistent findings of decreased long term groin pain. However, fibrin glue seems to have a slight advantage. Types of mesh have also been studied, suggesting a small advantage for lightweight over heavyweight, and for biologic mesh over synthetic.

=== Hernia sac ===
The role of hernia sac ligation is also being discussed. When ligation and excision of the sac is omitted, there is less reported short-term post-operative pain. However, the impact of this omission on long-term pain has not been widely studied so far.

== Treatment ==
=== Nonsurgical management ===
Evaluation and treatment can be very challenging in this patient population. Exam and imaging to exclude occult recurrence is important. Following that, use of antiinflammatories, nerve blocks, neuromodulators, and pain clinic referrals should be considered. Unless there is evidence of a recurrence, operative intervention should be deferred for at least 1 year since groin pain decreases with time elapsed from surgery.

=== Triple neurectomy and/or mesh removal ===
If operative repair is chosen, mesh excision +/- triple neurectomy may be considered with small studies suggesting good outcomes. The largest series encompassing 415 patient, most following open or suture repair, demonstrates significant improvement following triple neurectomy.

However, standard triple neurectomy does not address inguinodynia secondary to neuropathy of the genitofemoral nerve and the preperitoneal segment of its genital branch. But extension of the standard triple neurectomy to include the genitofemoral nerve has given good results, on a small series of 16 patients.

Mesh removal should only be considered in last resort. Meshes are easy to place but difficult to remove, due to their incorporation inside the peritoneum.

Other algorithms proposed have included diagnostic laparoscopy at the start for evaluation of adhesions, removal of mesh, and repair of any recurrences. If there is no improvement then a staged procedure to remove mesh and neurectomy may be considered.

== Prognosis ==
Chronic groin pain is more common than recurrence, and it may be lower following laparoscopic hernia repair. Pain often resolves with conservative measures. Following complete evaluation of patient and attempts at non surgical treatment, surgery may be considered. Various treatment algorithms exist with promising results.

== Incidence ==
The true incidence is difficult to determine, pain having a subjective component. A prospective series of open Lichtenstein (419 patients) noted that at 1 year followup, 19% of patients had pain, 6% with moderate or severe degree. Predictors of moderate or severe pain included: recurrent hernia, high pain score at 1 week postop, and high pain score at 4 weeks postop.

A Scottish population based study of 4062 patients identified at 3 months postop an incidence of 43% mild pain and 3% severe or very severe pain. The severe and very severe group was associated with young age and female gender. A further survey of the 3% severe pain cohort (at a median of 30 months) found that 29% resolved, 39% improved and 26% continued with severe, or very severe pain.

A followup of a randomized study of 750 laparoscopic vs. open hernia repair followed patients’ pain scores at 2 and 5 years post hernia repair via questionnaire. At 2 years, the chronic pain rate was 24.3% (lap) vs. 29.4% (open), and at 5 year follow up it was 18.1% (lap) vs. 20.1% (open). At 5 years, 4.3% in lap group and 3.7% in open group had attended a pain clinic.

A larger and more recent study which was a followup at 5 years of 1370 from a randomized study of TEP vs. open repair demonstrated lower pain rates in the laparoscopic group (10% vs. 20%). Inguinodynia symptoms decreased over time, even in those in the moderate to severe pain group. In addition, when an inguinal pain questionnaire was administered to these individuals at a median followup of 9.4 years, physical ability was affected more in the open repair group. Predictors of chronic pain in the TEP group included Body Mass Index ≤ 3rd quartile (OR: 3.04), difference in preop and postop physical testing (OR: 2.14) and time to full recovery exceeding the median (OR: 2.09). In the open group, the only association was noted with postoperative pain score exceeding the third quartile (OR: 1.89 ).

Use of mesh-based repair vs. suture-based repair has also been discussed. Some results suggest less inguinodynia after Shouldice (suture) than Lichtenstein (open mesh) for young men. Other studies find equal results between Shouldice and laparoscopic TEP. The experience of the surgeon critically impacts the results, especially for Shouldice and laparoscopic repairs, which are fairly technical operations.
