= Body of femur =

Long cylindrical part of the femur bone

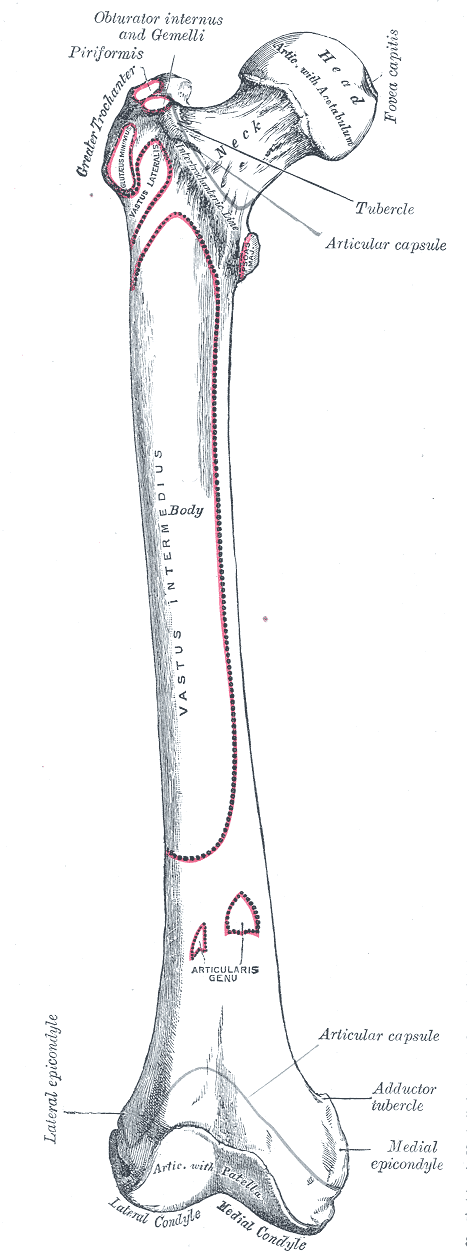
- Right femur. Anterior surface.

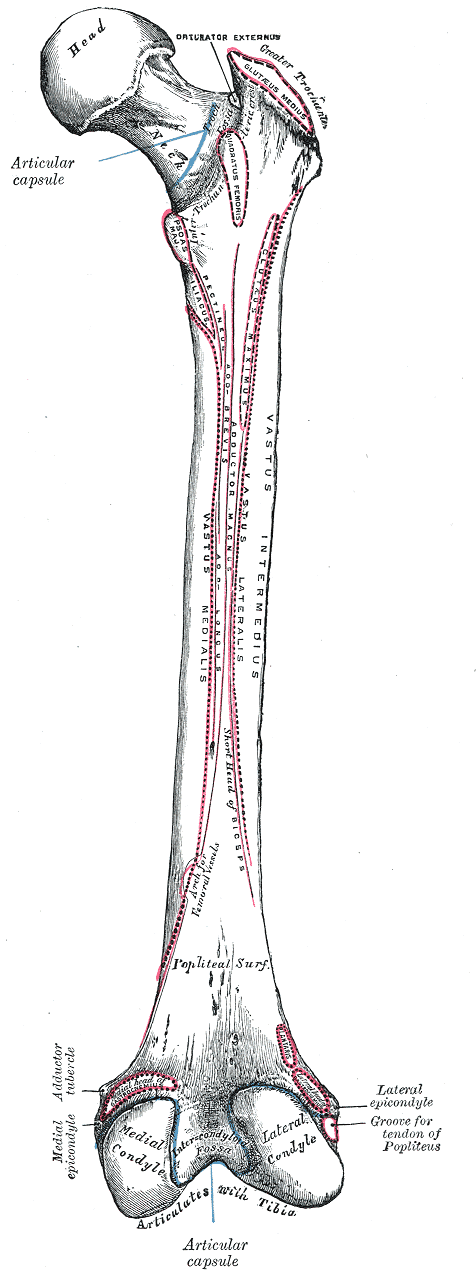
- Right femur. Posterior surface.

Details

Identifiers
- Latin: corpus femoris
- TA98: A02.5.04.012
- TA2: 1371
- FMA: 32847

In human anatomy, the body of femur (or shaft of femur) is the almost cylindrical, long part of the femur. It is a little broader above than in the center, broadest and somewhat flattened from before backward below. It is slightly arched, so as to be convex in front, and concave behind, where it is strengthened by a prominent longitudinal ridge, the linea aspera.

It presents for examination three borders, separating three surfaces.

Of the borders, one, the linea aspera, is posterior, one is medial, and the other, lateral.

== Borders ==
The borders of the femur are the linea aspera, a medial border, and a lateral border.

=== Linea aspera border ===
The linea aspera is a prominent longitudinal ridge or crest, on the middle third of the bone, presenting a medial and a lateral lip, and a narrow rough, intermediate line.

Above, the linea aspera is prolonged by three ridges.

The lateral ridge termed the gluteal tuberosity is very rough, and runs almost vertically upward to the base of the greater trochanter. It gives attachment to part of the gluteus maximus: its upper part is often elongated into a roughened crest, on which a more or less well-marked, rounded tubercle, the third trochanter, is occasionally developed.

The intermediate ridge or pectineal line is continued to the base of the lesser trochanter and gives attachment to the pectineus; the medial ridge is lost in the intertrochanteric line; between these two a portion of the iliacus is inserted.

Below, the linea aspera is prolonged into two ridges, enclosing between them a triangular area, the popliteal surface, upon which the popliteal artery rests.

Of these two ridges, the lateral is the more prominent, and descends to the summit of the lateral condyle.

The medial is less marked, especially at its upper part, where it is crossed by the femoral artery.

It ends below at the summit of the medial condyle, in a small tubercle, the adductor tubercle, which affords insertion to the tendon of the adductor magnus.

From the medial lip of the linea aspera and its prolongations above and below, the vastus medialis arises; and from the lateral lip and its upward prolongation, the vastus lateralis takes origin.

The adductor magnus is inserted into the linea aspera, and to its lateral prolongation above, and its medial prolongation below.

Between the vastus lateralis and the adductor magnus two muscles are attached: the gluteus maximus inserted above, and the short head of the biceps femoris arising below.

Between the adductor magnus and the vastus medialis four muscles are inserted: the iliacus and pectineus above; the adductor brevis and adductor longus below.

The linea aspera is perforated a little below its center by the nutrient canal, which is directed obliquely upward.

=== Lateral border and medial border ===
The other two borders of the femur are only slightly marked: the lateral border extends from the antero-inferior angle of the greater trochanter to the anterior extremity of the lateral condyle; the medial border from the intertrochanteric line, at a point opposite the lesser trochanter, to the anterior extremity of the medial condyle.

== Surfaces ==
=== Anterior surface ===
The anterior surface includes that portion of the shaft which is situated between the lateral and medial borders.

It is smooth, convex, broader above and below than in the center.

From the upper three-fourths of this surface the vastus intermedius arises; the lower fourth is separated from the muscle by the intervention of the synovial membrane of the knee-joint and a bursa; from the upper part of it the articularis genus takes origin.

=== Lateral surface ===
The lateral surface includes the portion between the lateral border and the linea aspera; it is continuous above with the corresponding surface of the greater trochanter, below with that of the lateral condyle: from its upper three-fourths the vastus intermedius takes origin.

=== Medial surface ===
The medial surface includes the portion between the medial border and the linea aspera; it is continuous above with the lower border of the neck, below with the medial side of the medial condyle: it is covered by the vastus medialis.
