= Lower extremity of femur =

Lower end of the thigh bone

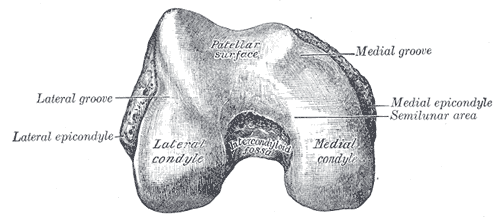
- Lower extremity of right femur viewed from below.

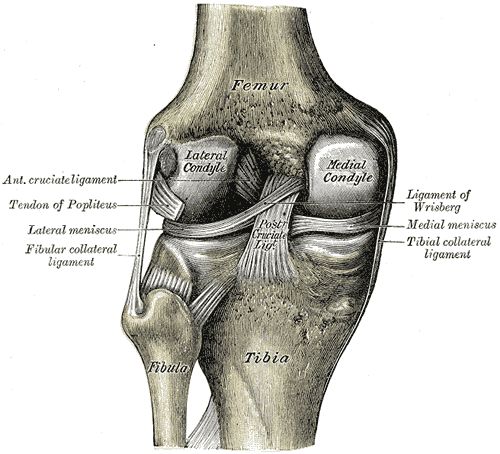
- Left knee joint from behind, showing interior ligaments.

Details

Identifiers
- Latin: Extremitas distalis ossis femoris
- FMA: 32844

The lower extremity of femur (or distal extremity) is the lower end of the femur (thigh bone) in human and other animals, closer to the knee. It is larger than the upper extremity of femur, is somewhat cuboid in form, but its transverse diameter is greater than its antero-posterior; it consists of two oblong eminences known as the lateral condyle and medial condyle.

== Condyles ==
Anteriorly, the condyles are slightly prominent and are separated by a smooth shallow articular depression called the patella surface. Posteriorly, they project considerably and a deep notch, the intercondylar fossa of femur, is present between them.

The lateral condyle is the more prominent and is the broader both in its antero-posterior and transverse diameters, the medial condyle is the longer and, when the femur is held with its body perpendicular, projects to a lower level.

However, when the femur is in its natural oblique position, the lower surfaces of the two condyles lie practically in the same horizontal plane.

The condyles are not quite parallel with one another; the long axis of the lateral is almost directly antero-posterior, but that of the medial runs backward and medialward.

Their opposed surfaces are small, rough, and concave, and form the walls of the intercondylar fossa.

This fossa is limited above by a ridge, the intercondyloid line, and below by the central part of the posterior margin of the patellar surface.

The posterior cruciate ligament of the knee joint is attached to the lower and front part of the medial wall of the fossa and the anterior cruciate ligament to an impression on the upper and back part of its lateral wall.

=== Epicondyles ===
Each condyle is surmounted by an elevation, the epicondyle.

The medial epicondyle is a large convex eminence to which the medial collateral ligament of the knee-joint is attached.

At its upper part is the adductor tubercle, and behind it is a rough impression which gives origin to the medial head of the gastrocnemius.

The lateral epicondyle, smaller and less prominent than the medial, gives attachment to the fibular collateral ligament of the knee-joint.

Directly below it is a small depression from which a smooth well-marked groove curves obliquely upward and backward to the posterior extremity of the condyle.

This groove is separated from the articular surface of the condyle by a prominent lip across which a second, shallower groove runs vertically downward from the depression.

In the fresh state these grooves are covered with cartilage.

The popliteus arises from the depression; its tendon lies in the oblique groove when the knee is flexed and in the vertical groove when the knee is extended.

Above and behind the lateral epicondyle is an area for the origin of the lateral head of the gastrocnemius, above and to the medial side of which the plantaris arises.

== Articular surface ==
The articular surface of the lower end of the femur occupies the anterior, inferior, and posterior surfaces of the condyles.

Its front part is named the patellar surface and articulates with the patella; it presents a median groove which extends downward to the intercondyloid fossa and two convexities, the lateral of which is broader, more prominent, and extends farther upward than the medial.

The lower and posterior parts of the articular surface constitute the tibial surfaces for articulation with the corresponding condyles of the tibia and menisci.

These surfaces are separated from one another by the intercondyloid fossa and from the patellar surface by faint grooves which extend obliquely across the condyles.

The lateral groove is the better marked; it runs lateralward and forward from the front part of the intercondyloid fossa, and expands to form a triangular depression.

When the knee-joint is fully extended, the triangular depression rests upon the anterior portion of the lateral meniscus, and the medial part of the groove comes into contact with the medial margin of the lateral articular surface of the tibia in front of the lateral tubercle of the tibial intercondyloid eminence.

The medial groove is less distinct than the lateral.

It does not reach as far as the intercondyloid fossa and therefore exists only on the medial part of the condyle; it receives the anterior edge of the medial meniscus when the knee-joint is extended.

Where the groove ceases laterally the patellar surface is seen to be continued backward as a semilunar area close to the anterior part of the intercondyloid fossa; this semilunar area articulates with the medial vertical facet of the patella in forced flexion of the knee-joint.

The tibial surfaces of the condyles are convex from side to side and from before backward. Each presents a double curve, its posterior segment being an arc of a circle, its anterior, part of a cycloid.

== Additional images ==
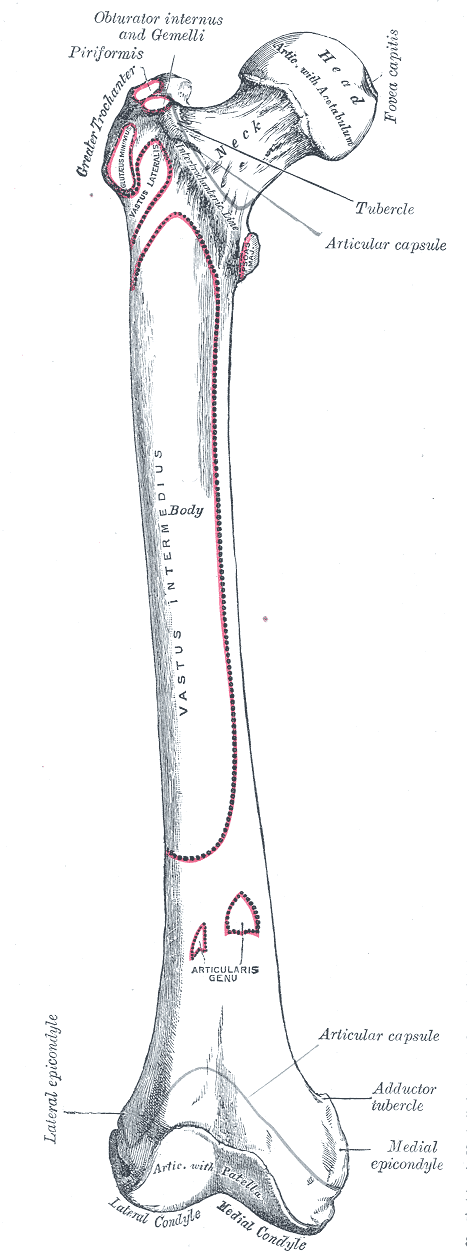
Right femur. Anterior surface.

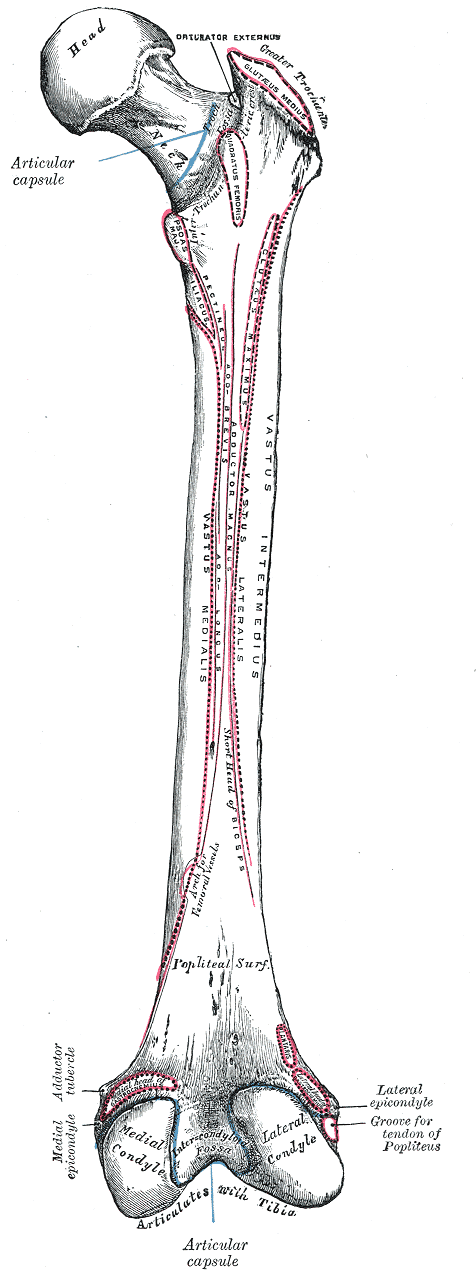
Right femur. Posterior surface.
