= Medial patellofemoral ligament =

Ligament of the knee

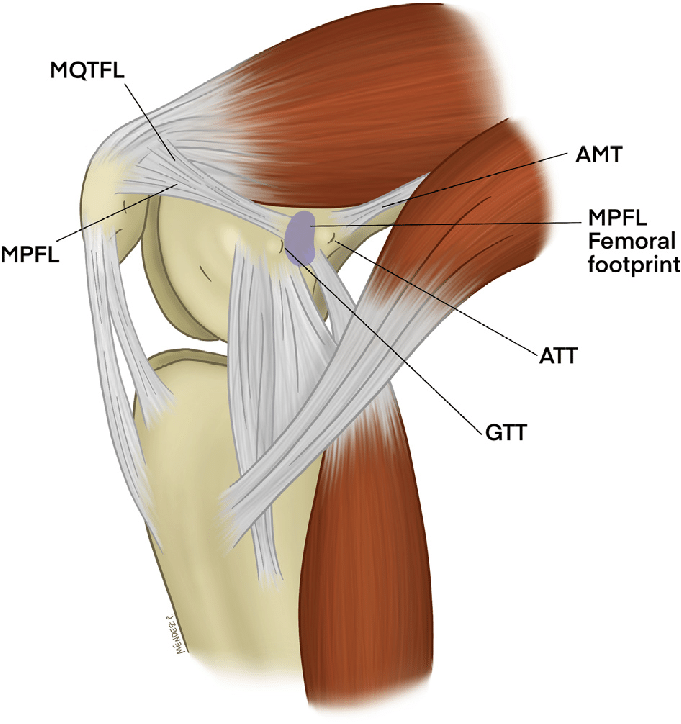
- Medial view of a flexed knee is shown. Fig 1. Medial view of a flexed knee is shown. Anatomy of the MPFL. (AMT, adductor magnus tendon; ATT, adductor tendon tubercle; GTT, gastrocnemius tendon tubercle; MPFL, medial patellofemoral ligament; MQTFL, medial quadriceps tendon femoral ligament.)

The medial patellofemoral ligament (MPFL) is one of several ligaments on the medial aspect of the knee. It originates in the superomedial aspect of the patella and inserts in the space between the adductor tubercle and the medial femoral epicondyle. The ligament itself extends from the femur to the superomedial patella, and its shape is similar to a trapezoid. It keeps the patella in place, but its main function is to prevent lateral displacement of the patella.

== Structure ==
The MPFL is located in the second soft tissue layer in the knee; this layer also includes the medial collateral ligament. The middle layer has the most consequential role in the patella's stabilization. The MPFL's origin is on the femur between the medial femoral epicondyle and the adductor tubercle, while being superior to the superficial medial collateral ligament. From the origin, it moves anteriorly, and combines with the deep portion of the vastus medialus oblique, inserting to the superomedial side of the patella, creating greater stability in the joint.

== Function ==
The purpose of the MPFL is to keep the patella stabilized; the ligament itself is responsible for 50–80% of the stability that is needed to prevent lateral patellar dislocation. The ligament is able to gain this stability by keeping the patella stable in the trochlear groove. The addition of two other ligaments: the medial patellotibial ligament (MPTL) and the medial patellomeniscal ligament (MPML) aide the MPFL to maintain stabilization.

== Clinical significance ==
The MPFL is the primary stabilizer to lateral displacement of the patella providing approximately 50–60% of restraining force. Injury to the MPFL is most common during a non-contact twisting action. The most likely time for the patella to shift laterally is during the first 20–30 degrees of flexion as the quadriceps tighten simultaneously and pull the patella laterally. Beyond 30 degrees, the quadriceps tendon and patellar ligament pull the patella posterior into the groove of the knee joint making lateral dislocation of the patella unlikely.

Dislocation recurs in about 15–44% of cases, and symptoms continue in about half. Recurrence of a laterally displaced patella is more common as the incidence of dislocation continues in the affected individual. Repairing the MPFL can be done surgically through an MPFL reconstruction. Indications for surgical incisions are two documented patellar dislocations and exam findings of excessive lateral patellar mobility.

MPFL reconstruction involves attaching two connections to the patella and one to the femur. This reconstruction holds the femur and patella in place.

=== Injury ===
Injuries to the MPFL are rare, and mostly occur in athletes. With lateral patellar dislocation, the MPFL is ruptured 90% of the time. The patella rests in the trochlear, which is found in the distal part of the femur. The patella can dislocate from the groove because of trauma or an unnatural twisting of the knee. When dislocated, the soft tissue layer that the patella rests in is damaged; the patella is forced out of its groove and back into place. The knee dislocates towards the outside of the leg, leaving the MPFL torn. If the injury to the ligament is left untreated, it may be able to heal on its own, but likely in a loosened or lengthened position. This leaves the patella vulnerable to repeated dislocation in the future. In turn, repeated dislocations can lead to tearing cartilage in the knee. Once damaged, there is increased risk of patellofemoral arthritis, which is significantly more difficult to treat than the initial tear.

=== Nonsurgical treatment ===
For nonsurgical treatment of the MPFL, the knee must not have any loose pieces of soft tissue, cartilage, or bone within it. Initially, patients have their knees immobilized for the ligament to heal. Physical therapy is often prescribed as a nonsurgical treatment of a tear, in which functional rehabilitation and range of motion exercises that focus primarily on the hips, gluteal muscles, and quadriceps are used to strengthen the muscles surrounding the knee. During the recovery phase, heat and ice are often applied as pain managers before and after treatment.

=== Surgical treatment ===
Patients may be restricted from eating and drinking on the day of the surgery. During surgery, patients are given regional anesthesia and a nerve block in the spinal cord that numbs the lower half of the body, and an IV for sedation. An orthopedic surgeon replaces the injured ligament with either a hamstring tendon from the patient or from a allograft tendon from a cadaver The surgeon uses an arthroscope to view the interior of the knee, and the reconstruction itself is performed with two small incisions. Initial surgery takes approximately one hour, and the patient is usually released on the day of the surgery.

Most MPFL surgeries are successful without any complications. MPFL surgeries have a 95% success rate. Complications may include fractures, infections, or blood clots. In children, this surgery can be safely performed in open growth plates. Formerly, children were placed in a brace after the procedure, but this practice increased the risk of more dislocations before skeletal maturity and is no longer used.

Rehabilitation for an MPFL repair usually involves physical therapy, with the initial recovery time being 4–7 months. During the immediate post-operation phase, the knee is protected at all times. Patients do not bear weight on the knee for the first two weeks after surgery, with no range of motion. Typically, after six weeks, the patient starts physical therapy. If the patient is an athlete, their doctor and physical therapist must approve their return to sports.
