= Femur epicondyle =

Femur epicondyle may refer to:

- Lateral epicondyle of the femur
- Medial epicondyle of the femur
