= Adductor minimus muscle =

Small and flat skeletal muscle in the thigh

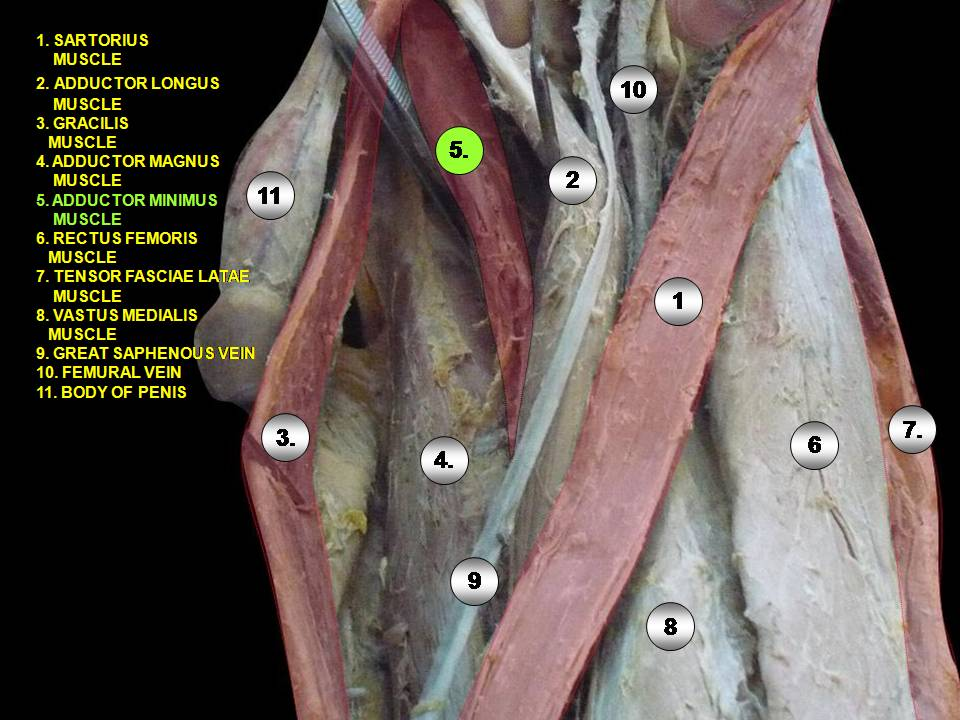

Details
- Origin: Inferior ramus
- Insertion: Linea aspera of the femur
- Artery: Obturator artery and the medial circumflex femoral artery of the femoral artery
- Nerve: Obturator and tibial nerves
- Actions: Adduction and lateral rotation of thigh

Identifiers
- Latin: musculus adductor minimus
- TA98: A04.7.02.029
- TA2: 2632
- FMA: 43885

In human anatomy, the adductor minimus (adductor femoris minimus or adductor quartus) is a small and flat skeletal muscle in the thigh which constitutes the upper, lateral part of the adductor magnus muscle. It adducts and laterally rotates the femur.

== Structure ==
The adductor minimus originates on the pelvis at the inferior ramus of the pubis as the anterior-most part of the adductor magnus. It is inserted on the back of the femur at the medial lip of the linea aspera and thus crosses the proximal part of the true adductor magnus.

The adductor minimus and the adductor magnus are frequently separated by a branch of the superior perforating branch of the profunda femoris artery and the former muscle is considered independent from the latter because it is primarily a separate entity.

=== Innervation ===
It shares innervation with the adductor magnus; the obturator nerve supplies the part attached to the linea aspera while the tibial nerve (L3-5), a branch of the sciatic nerve, supplies the part inserted onto adductor tubercle.

=== Variation ===
In 33% of people, a supernumerary muscle is found between the adductor brevis and minimus. When present, this muscle originates from the upper part of the inferior ramus of the pubis from where it runs downwards and laterally. In half of cases, it inserts into the anterior surface of the insertion aponeurosis of the adductor minimus. In the remaining cases, it is either inserted into the upper part of the pectineal line or the posterior part of the lesser trochanter. While similar to its neighbouring adductors, it is formed by separation from the superficial layer of the obturator externus, and is thus not ontogenetically related to the adductors.
