= Collateral ligament of knee =

Collateral ligament of knee may refer to:

- Medial collateral ligament
- Fibular collateral ligament
