= Cortical desmoid =

Condition of the femur

Cortical desmoid (also known as a tug lesion or periosteal desmoid) is an irregularity of the distal femoral cortex that is caused by repetitive stress at the attachment of the adductor magnus aponeurosis. It is commonly observed in adolescents and is usually asymptomatic. This lesion is benign and tends to be self-limiting.
