= Medial epicondyle =

Medial epicondyle can refer to:

- Medial epicondyle of the humerus (ventral epicondyle in birds)
- Medial epicondyle of the femur
