= Lateral epicondyle =

Lateral epicondyle can refer to:

- Lateral epicondyle of the humerus (dorsal epicondyle in birds)
- Lateral epicondyle of the femur
