= Femoral-tibial angle =

The femoral-tibial angle is the angle between the femur and tibia.

== Overview ==
In humans, the two femurs converge medially toward the knees, where they articulate with the proximal ends of the tibiae. The angle of convergence of the femora is a major factor in determining the femoral-tibial angle.

In human females the femora converge more than in males because the pelvic bone is wider in females. In the condition genu valgum (knock knee) the femurs converge so much that the knees touch one another. The opposite extreme is genu varum (bow-leggedness).

In the general population of people without either genu valgum or genu varum, the femoral-tibial angle is about 175 degrees.
