= Linea aspera =

Ridge on the posterior surface of the shaft of the femur

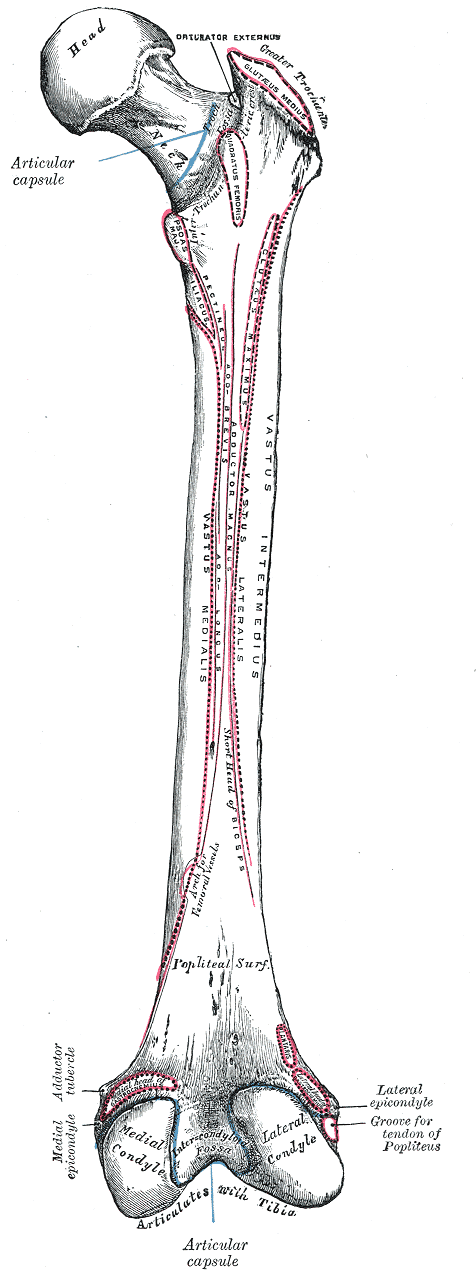
- Right femur. Posterior surface. (Linea aspera not labeled, but region is visible. Medial lip is at left; lateral lip is at right.)

Details

Identifiers
- Latin: linea aspera
- TA98: A02.5.04.013
- TA2: 1372
- FMA: 75101

The linea aspera (Latin: rough line, sometimes called crista aspera, rough crest) is a ridge of roughened surface on the posterior surface of the shaft of the femur. It is the site of attachments of muscles and the intermuscular septum. Sometimes the linea is accompanied by the bone raise underneath, this optional feature is called a pilaster.

Its margins diverge above and below.

The linea aspera is a prominent longitudinal ridge or crest, on the middle third of the bone, presenting a medial and a lateral lip, and a narrow rough, intermediate line. It is an important insertion point for the adductors and the lateral and medial intermuscular septa that divides the thigh into three compartments. The tension generated by muscle attached to the bones is responsible for the formation of the ridges.

== Structure ==
=== Above ===
Above, the linea aspera is prolonged by three ridges.

- The lateral ridge is very rough, and runs almost vertically upward to the base of the greater trochanter. It is termed the gluteal tuberosity, and gives attachment to part of the gluteus maximus: its upper part is often elongated into a roughened crest, on which a more or less well-marked, rounded tubercle, the third trochanter, is occasionally developed.
- The intermediate ridge or pectineal line is continued to the base of the lesser trochanter and gives attachment to the pectineus muscle;
- the medial ridge is lost in the intertrochanteric crest; between the intermediate and medial ridges a portion of the iliacus muscle is inserted.

=== Below ===
Below, the linea aspera is prolonged into two ridges, enclosing between them a triangular area, the popliteal surface, upon which the popliteal artery rests.

- Of these two ridges, the lateral is the more prominent, and descends to the summit of the lateral condyle.
- The medial is less marked, especially at its upper part, where it is crossed by the femoral artery. It ends below at the summit of the medial condyle, in a small tubercle, the adductor tubercle, which affords insertion to the tendon of the adductor magnus.

=== Development ===
The tension generated by muscle attached to the bones is responsible for the formation of the ridges.

== Function ==
A number of muscles attach to the linea aspera:

- From the medial lip of the linea aspera and its prolongations above and below, the vastus medialis muscle originates.
- From the lateral lip and its upward prolongation, the vastus lateralis muscle takes origin.
- The adductor magnus muscle is inserted into the linea aspera, and to its lateral prolongation above, and its medial prolongation below.
- Between the vastus lateralis and the adductor magnus two muscles are attached:
  - the gluteus maximus muscle inserted above,
  - and the short head of the biceps femoris muscle originating below.
- Between the adductor magnus and the vastus medialis four muscles are inserted:
  - the iliacus muscle and pectineus muscle above;
  - the adductor brevis muscle and adductor longus muscle below.

The linea aspera is perforated a little below its center by the nutrient canal, which is directed obliquely upward.

== Additional images ==
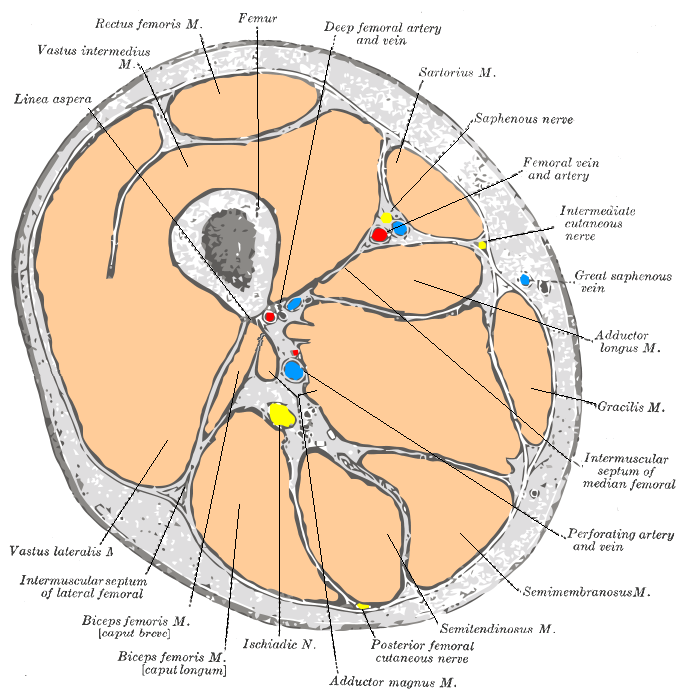
Cross-section through the middle of the thigh.

== Sources ==
- Hrdlička, Aleš (1934). "Contributions to the study of the femur: The crista aspera and the pilaster". American Journal of Physical Anthropology. 19 (1): 17–37. doi:10.1002/ajpa.1330190116. ISSN 0002-9483.
- Köhler, Alban (1956). Borderlands of the Normal and Early Pathologic in Skeletal Roentgenology. Grune & Stratton.
