= Intercondylar fossa of femur =

Extension of the thigh bone that secures the knee

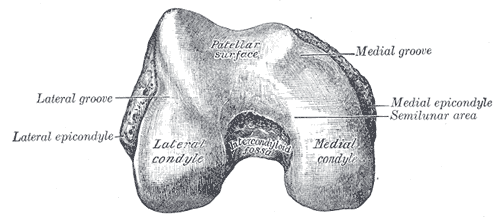
- Lower extremity of right femur viewed from below

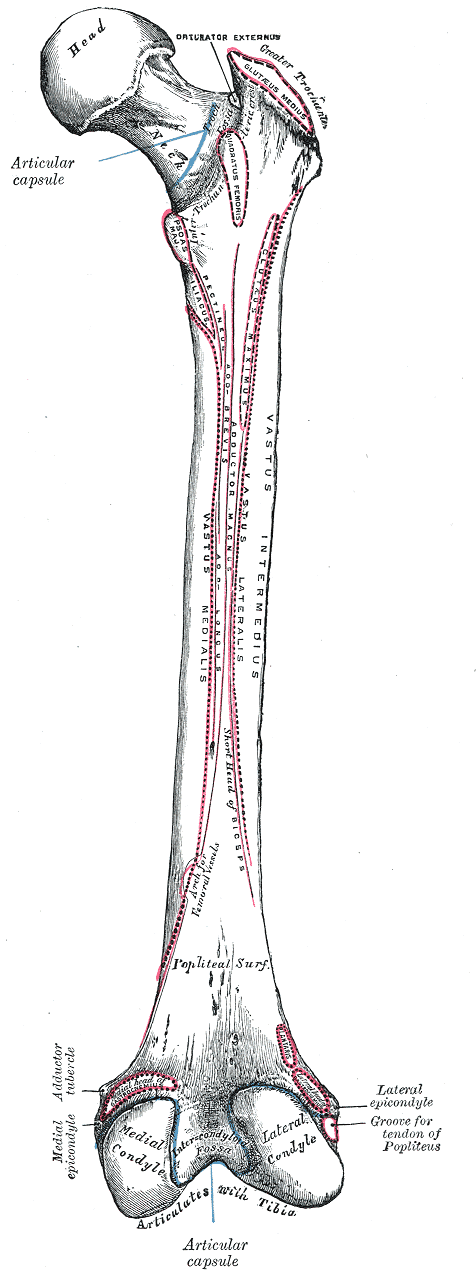
- Right femur seen from behind

Details

Identifiers
- Latin: fossa intercondylaris femoris
- TA98: A02.5.04.028
- TA2: 1387
- FMA: 43748

The intercondylar fossa of femur (intercondyloid fossa of femur, intercondylar notch of femur) is a deep notch between the rear surfaces of the medial and lateral epicondyle of the femur, two protrusions on the distal end of the femur (thigh bone) that joins the knee. On the front of the femur, the condyles are but much less prominent and are separated from one another by a smooth shallow articular depression called the patellar surface because it articulates with the posterior surface of the patella (kneecap).

The intercondylar fossa of femur and/or the patellar surface may also be referred to as the patellar groove, patellar sulcus, patellofemoral groove, femoropatellar groove, femoral groove, femoral sulcus, trochlear groove of femur, trochlear sulcus of femur, trochlear surface of femur, or trochlea of femur.

On a lateral radiograph, it is evident as Blumensaat's line.

== Additional images ==
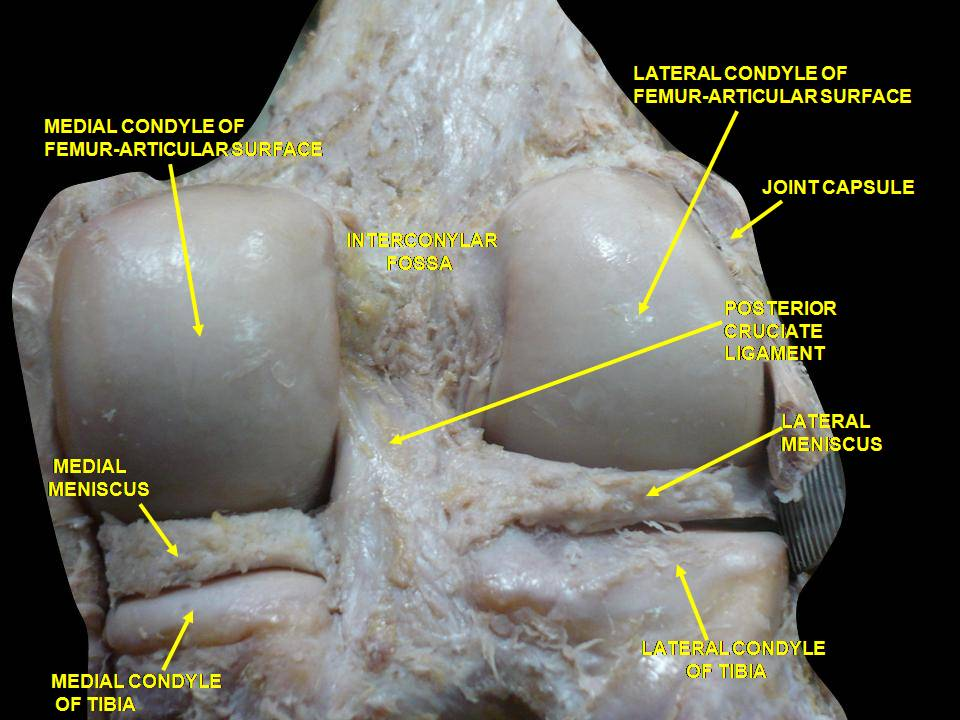
Right knee in extension. Deep dissection. Posterior view.

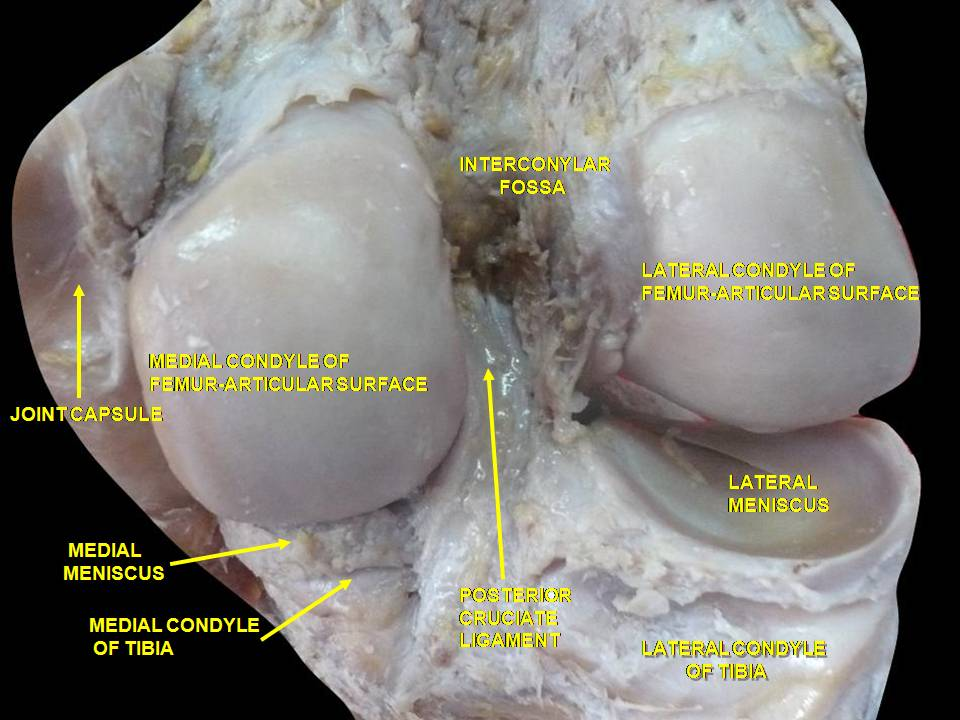
Right knee in extension. Deep dissection. Posterior view.

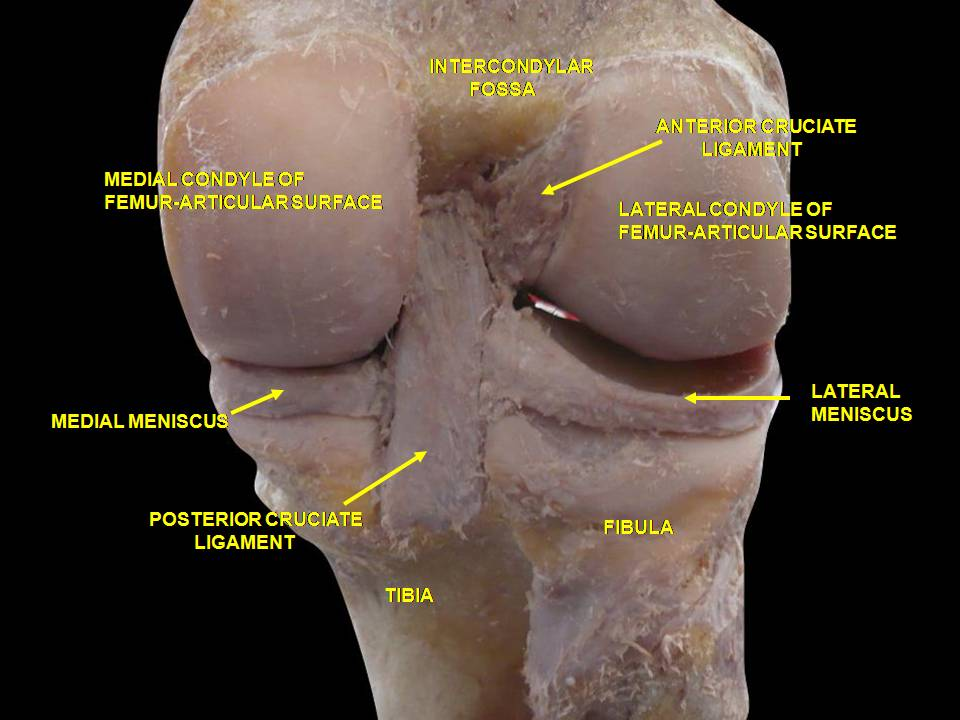
Knee joint. Deep dissection. Posterior view.
