= Epicondyle =

Anatomical bone structure

Details

Identifiers
- Latin: epicondylus
- TA98: A02.0.00.030
- FMA: 75435

An epicondyle (/ˌɛpɪˈkɒndaɪl/) is a rounded eminence on a bone that lies upon a condyle (epi-, "upon" + condyle, from a root meaning "knuckle" or "rounded articular area"). There are various epicondyles in the human skeleton, each named by its anatomic site. They include the following:

Epicondyle name	Comments
medial epicondyle of the humerus (ventral epicondyle in birds)	In humans, on the "inboard" side of the elbow
lateral epicondyle of the humerus (dorsal epicondyle in birds)	In humans, on the "outboard" side of the elbow
medial epicondyle of the femur	
lateral epicondyle of the femur	
