= Condyle =

Round prominence at the end of a bone

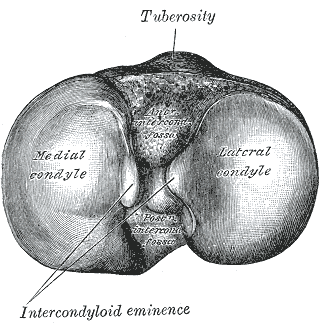
- Upper surface of right tibia.

Details

Identifiers
- Latin: condylus
- TA98: A02.0.00.029
- FMA: 75434

A condyle (/ˈkɒndɪl, -daɪl/; Latin: condylus, from Greek: kondylos; κόνδυλος knuckle) is the round prominence at the end of a bone, most often part of a synovial joint – an encapsulated articulation with another bone. It is one of the markings or features of bones, and can refer to:

- On the femur, in the knee joint:
  - Medial condyle
  - Lateral condyle
- On the tibia, in the knee joint:
  - Medial condyle
  - Lateral condyle
- On the humerus, in the elbow joint:
  - Condyle of humerus (Condylus humeri)
- On the mandible, in the temporomandibular joint:
  - Mandibular condyle
- On the occipital bone, in the atlanto-occipital joint:
  - Occipital condyles

Although not generally termed condyles, the trochlea and capitulum of the humerus act as condyles in the elbow, and the femur head acts as a condyle in the hip joint.

Condyle may also be used to describe an intrusion of the endocarp into the seed cavity of flowering plants like Abuta.
