= Condyle of humerus =

Details

Identifiers
- Latin: condylus humeri
- TA98: A02.4.04.021
- TA2: 1201
- FMA: 23377

The condyle of humerus is the distal end of the humerus. It is made up of the capitulum and the trochlea.
