= Gluteal tuberosity =

Ridge of the linea aspera of the femur where gluteus maximus muscle inserts

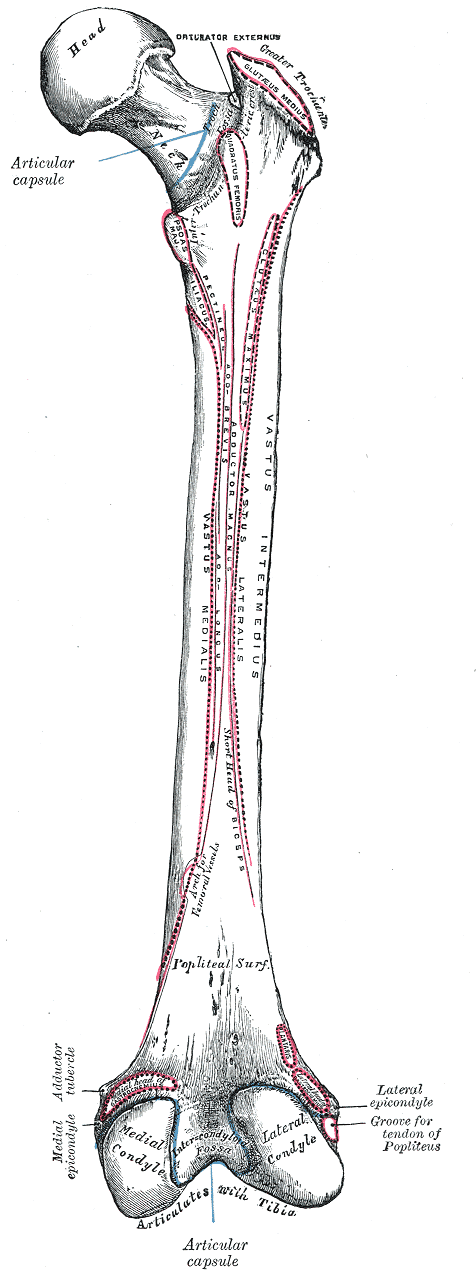
- Right femur. Posterior surface. (Gluteal tuberosity not labeled, but visible at upper right, where attachment of gluteus maximus is indicated.)

Details

Identifiers
- Latin: tuberositas glutaea femoris
- TA98: A02.5.04.017
- TA2: 1376
- FMA: 43727

The gluteal tuberosity is the lateral one of the three upward prolongations of the linea aspera of the femur, extending to the base of the greater trochanter. It serves as the principal insertion site for the gluteus maximus muscle.

== Structure ==
The gluteal tuberosity is the lateral prolongation of three prolongations of the linea aspera that extending superior-ward from the superior extremity of the linea aspera on the posterior surface of the femur.

The gluteal tuberosity takes the form of either an elongated depression or a rough ridge. It extends from the linea aspera nearly vertically superior-ward to the base of the greater trochanter. Its superior part is often elongated to form a roughened crest, upon which a more or less prominent rounded tubercle – the third trochanter – is occasionally developed.

=== Attachments ===
The gluteal tuberosity is the principal site of insertion of the gluteus maximus muscle, accepting the muscle's tendon (the gluteus maximus muscle additionally also inserts onto the iliotibial tract).
