= Adductor magnus muscle =

Muscle in the thigh

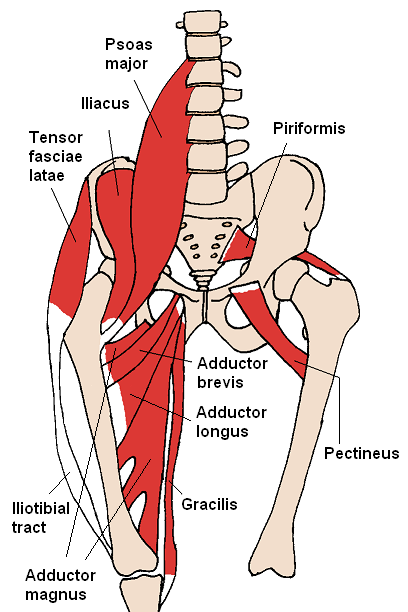
- The adductor magnus and nearby muscles

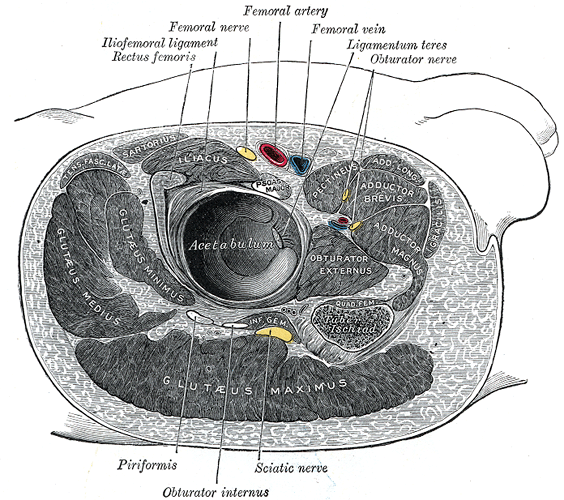
- Structures surrounding right hip-joint (adductor magnus at upper right)

Details
- Origin: Pubis, tuberosity of the ischium
- Insertion: Linea aspera and adductor tubercle of femur
- Artery: Deep femoral artery
- Nerve: Posterior branch of obturator nerve (adductor) and sciatic nerve (hamstring)
- Actions: Adduction of hip (both portions) flexion of hip (adductor portion) extension of hip (hamstring portion)

Identifiers
- Latin: musculus adductor magnus
- TA98: A04.7.02.028
- TA2: 2630
- FMA: 22443

The adductor magnus is a large triangular muscle, situated on the medial side of the thigh.

It consists of two parts. The portion which arises from the ischiopubic ramus (a small part of the inferior ramus of the pubis, and the inferior ramus of the ischium) is called the pubofemoral portion, adductor portion, or adductor minimus, and the portion arising from the tuberosity of the ischium is called the ischiocondylar portion, extensor portion, or "hamstring portion". Due to its common embryonic origin, innervation, and action, the ischiocondylar portion (or hamstring portion) is often considered part of the hamstring group of muscles. The ischiocondylar portion of the adductor magnus is considered a muscle of the posterior compartment of the thigh while the pubofemoral portion of the adductor magnus is considered a muscle of the medial compartment.

== Structure ==
=== Pubofemoral (adductor) portion ===
Those fibers which arise from the ramus of the pubis are short, horizontal in direction, and are inserted into the rough line of the femur leading from the greater trochanter to the linea aspera, medial to the gluteus maximus.

Those fibers from the ramus of the ischium are directed downward and laterally with different degrees of obliquity, to be inserted, by means of a broad aponeurosis, into the linea aspera and the upper part of its medial prolongation below.

=== Ischiocondylar (hamstring) portion ===
The medial portion of the muscle, composed principally of the fibers arising from the tuberosity of the ischium, forms a thick fleshy mass consisting of coarse bundles which descend almost vertically, and end about the lower third of the thigh in a rounded tendon which is inserted into the adductor tubercle on the medial condyle of the femur, and is connected by a fibrous expansion to the line leading upward from the tubercle to the linea aspera.

=== Relations ===
It is bounded by the following:

- By its anterior surface in relation with the pectineus, adductor brevis, adductor longus, femoral artery and vein, profunda artery and vein, with their branches, and with the posterior branches of the obturator artery, obturator vein and obturator nerve.
- By its posterior surface with the semitendinosus, semimembranosus, biceps, and gluteus maximus muscle.
- By its inner border with the gracilis and sartorius.
- By its upper border with the obturator externus, and quadratus femoris.

=== Nerve supply ===
It is a composite muscle as the adductor and hamstring portions of the muscle are innervated by two different nerves. The adductor portion is innervated by the posterior division of the obturator nerve while the hamstring portion is innervated by the sciatic nerve.

=== Blood supply ===
The adductor magnus has multiple varying arteries to supply blood flow. The major arteries in the magnus can be divided into the three categories. The primary blood supplier which consist of branches from the profunda femoris (Deep femoral artery), the superior supplier that is the Medial Femoral circumflex artery, and the inferior suppliers that are the femoral, popliteal and genicular arteries

=== Osseoaponeurotic openings ===
At the insertion of the muscle, there is a series of five osseoaponeurotic openings, formed by tendinous arches attached to the bone. The upper four openings are small, and give passage to the perforating branches of the profunda femoris artery. The lowest (often referred to as the adductor hiatus) is large, and transmits the femoral vessels to the popliteal fossa.

=== Variation ===
The upper, lateral part of the adductor magnus is an incompletely separated division often considered a separate muscle — the adductor minimus. These two muscles are frequently separated by a branch of the superior perforating branch of the profunda femoris artery.

== Function ==
The adductor magnus is a powerful adductor of the thigh, made especially active when the legs are moved from a wide spread position to one in which the legs parallel each other. The part attached to the linea aspera acts as a lateral rotator. The part which reaches the medial epicondyle acts as a medial rotator when the leg is rotated outwards and flexed, and also acts to extend the hip joint.The posterior part of the adductor magnus is an effective hip extensor due to it containing the largest moment arm compared to the hamstring muscles, this moment arm increases until the hip reaches a flexion of 60 degrees.

== Clinical significance ==
The adductor magnus has relevance to physiotherapy as it can possibly contribute to knee pain due to tight adductors. The consistently overuse of the adductors and adductor magnus has a chance to cause adductor tendinopathy

=== Training ===
The adductor magnus can be trained using weight and resistance training. Although it is difficult to completely isolate the adductor magnus during training, it is still possible to put emphasis on this muscle with specific exercises. An exercise that's demonstrated large magnus contraction is the isometric hip adduction with bent knees.

== Other animals ==
In other tetrapods, the adductor magnus crosses the knee joint and inserts into the tibia. In humans, the distal part of the tendon detaches and becomes the medial collateral ligament of the knee. Because of this, the medial collateral ligament of the knee in humans may contain a few muscle fibres as an atavistic variation.

== Additional images ==
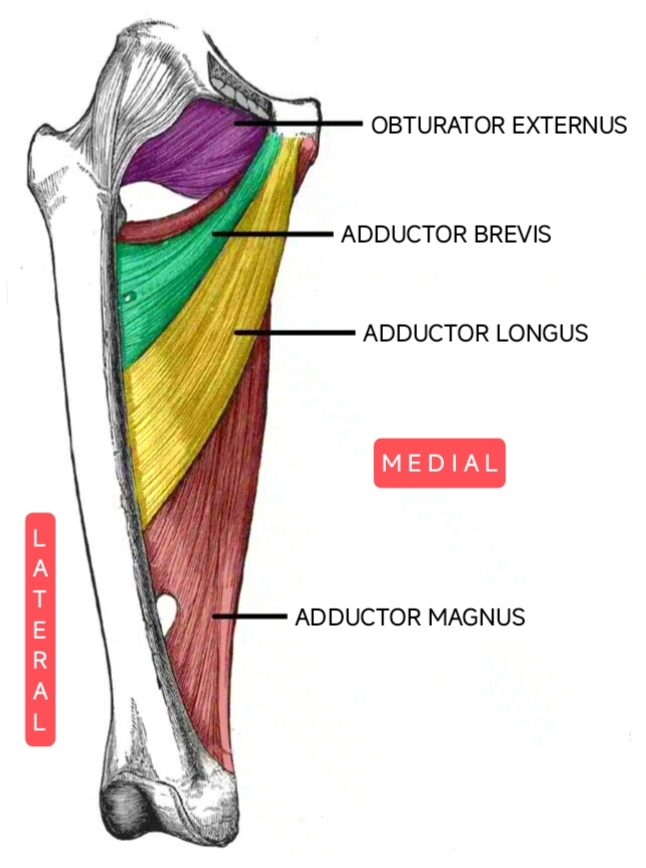
Deep muscles of the medial femoral region; right side, anterior view. (After Gray.)

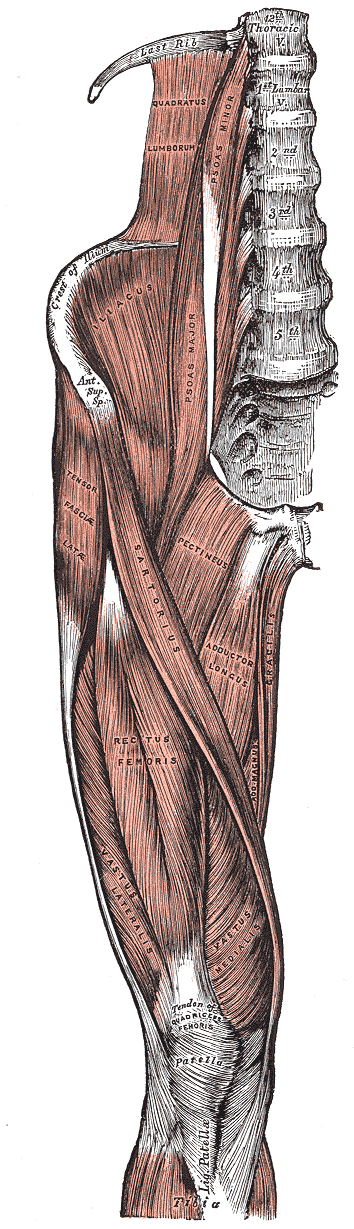
Muscles of the iliac and anterior femoral regions.

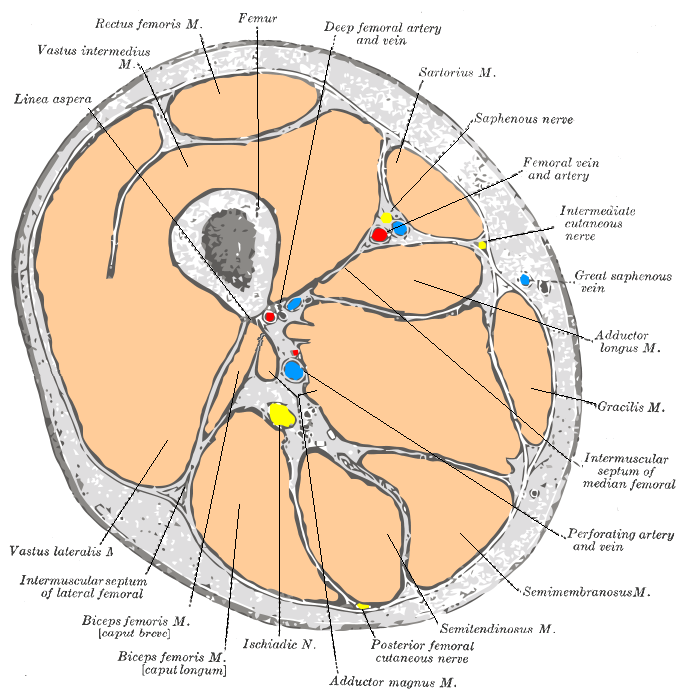
Cross-section through the middle of the thigh.

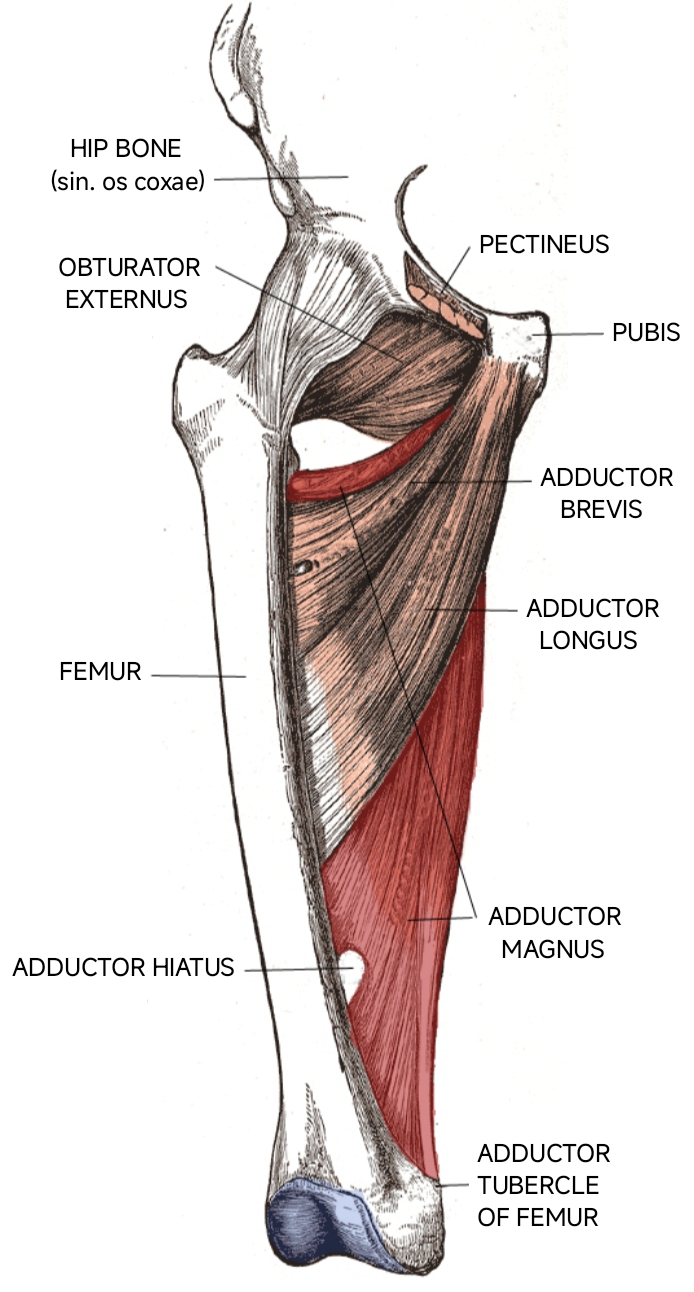
Deep muscles of the medial femoral region.

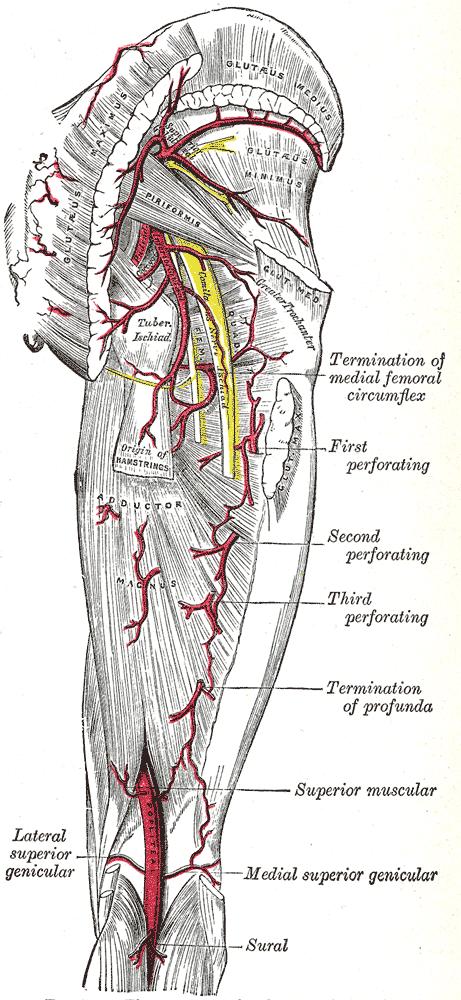
The arteries of the gluteal and posterior femoral regions.

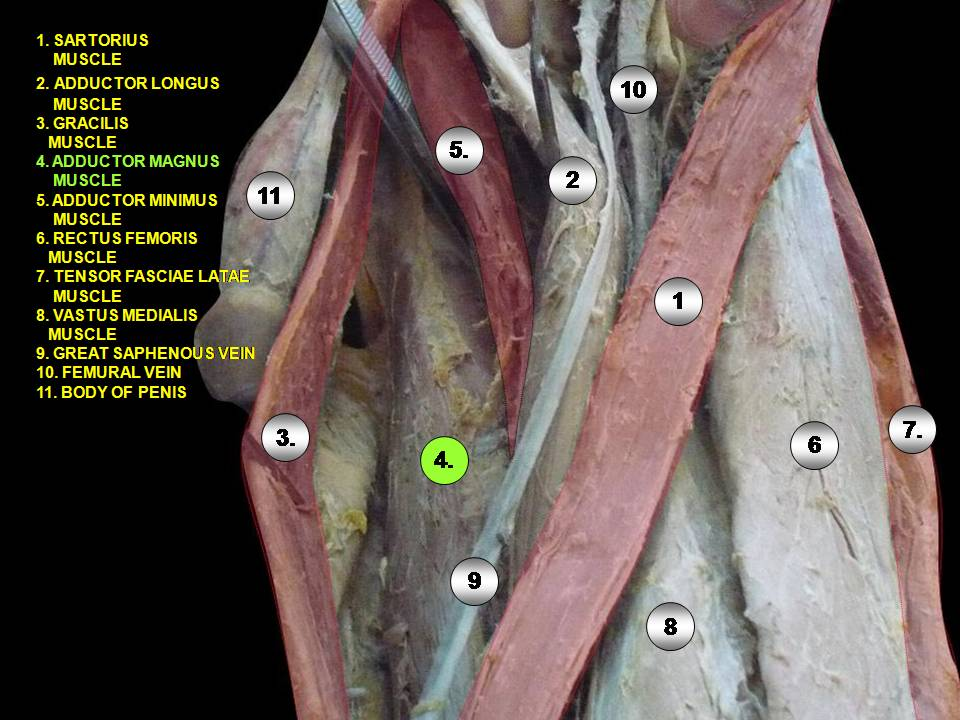
Adductor magnus muscle

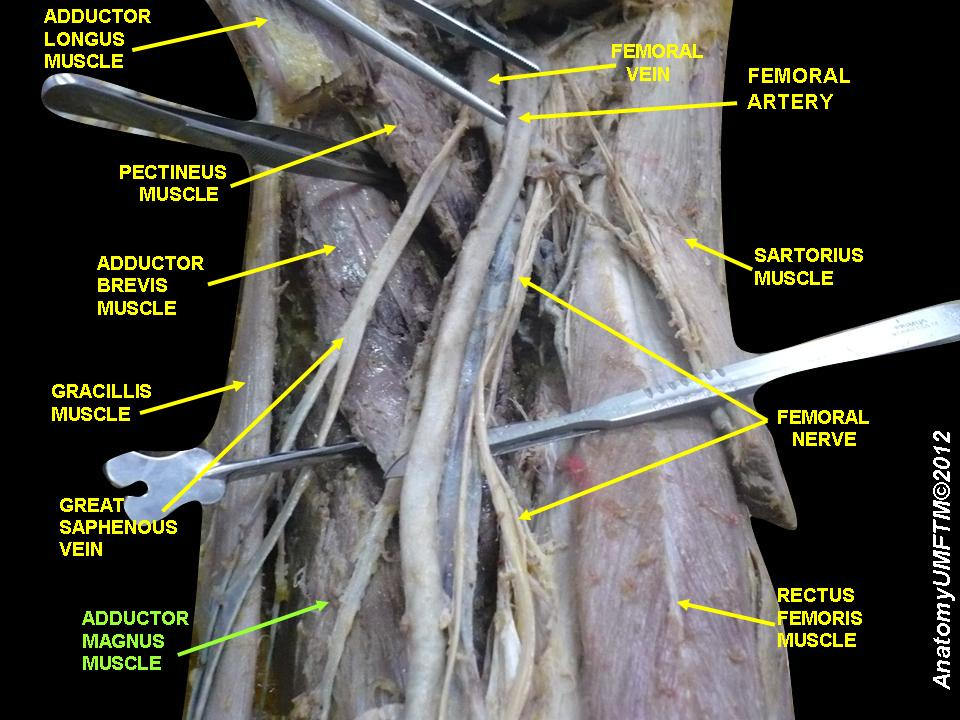
Adductor magnus muscle

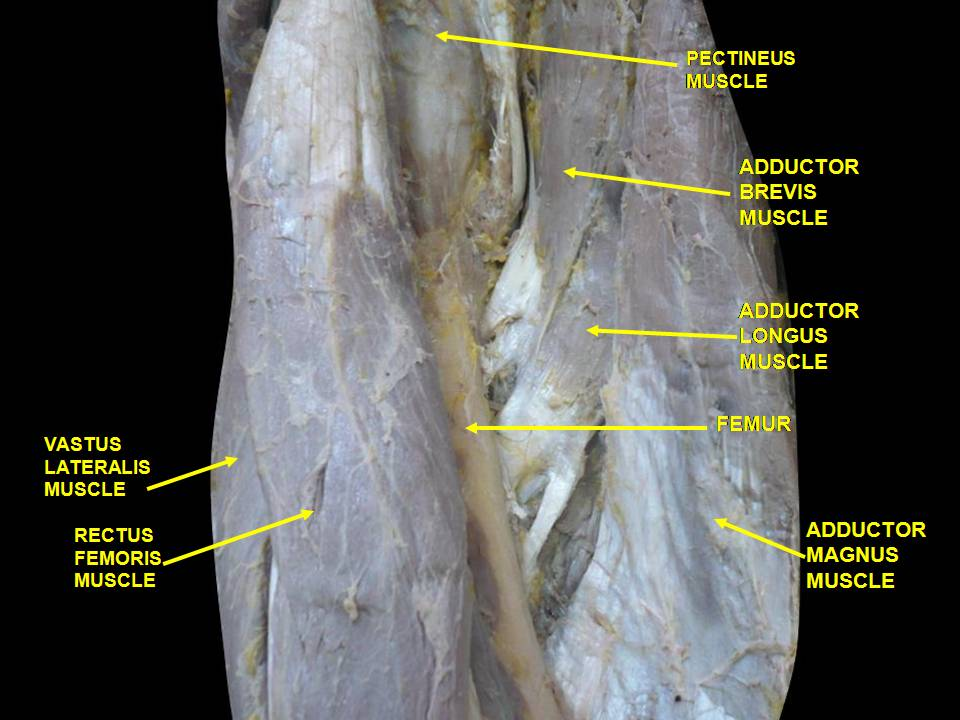
Muscles of thigh. Anterior views.

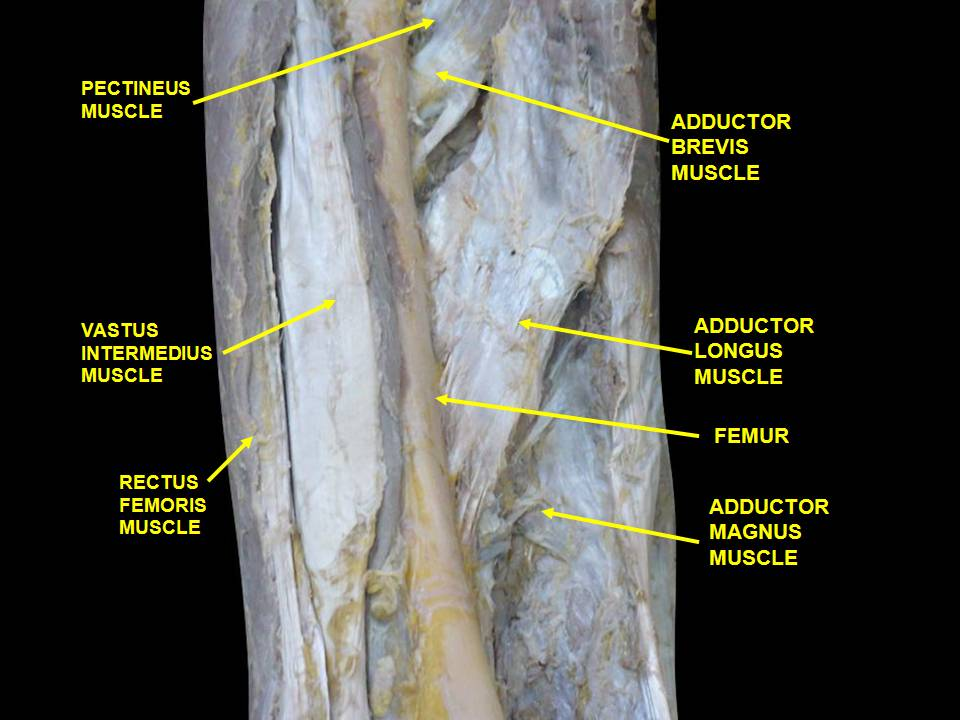
Muscles of thigh. Anterior views.

== See also ==
- Adductor hiatus
