= Adductor tubercle of femur =

Tubercle of the lower extremity of the femur where the adductor magnus muscle inserts

Adductor tubercle
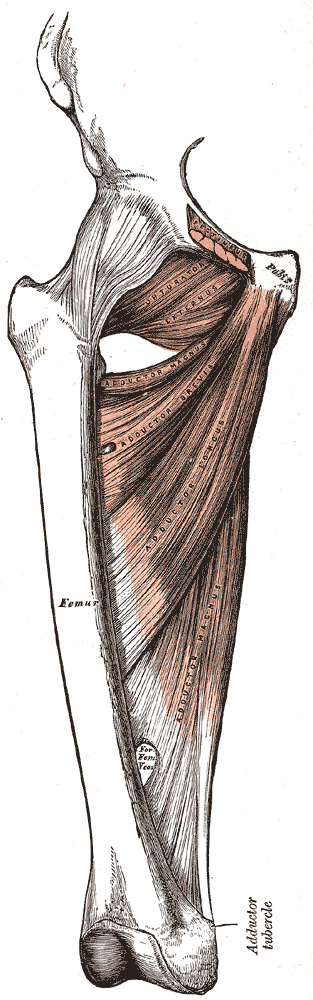
- Deep muscles of the medial femoral region (adductor tubercle labeled at bottom right)

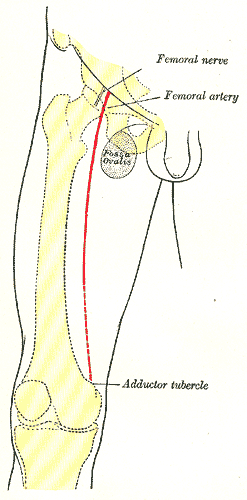
- Front of right thigh, showing surface markings for bones, femoral artery and nerve (adductor tubercle labeled at bottom right)

Details

Identifiers
- Latin: tuberculum adductorium femoris
- TA98: A02.5.04.023
- TA2: 1382
- FMA: 32870

The adductor tubercle is a tubercle on the lower extremity of the femur. It is formed where the medial lips of the linea aspera end below at the summit of the medial condyle. It is the insertion point of the tendon of the vertical fibers of the adductor magnus muscle.

== See also ==
- Quadrate tubercle
