= Fibular collateral ligament =

Collateral fibular ligament

Lateral collateral ligament
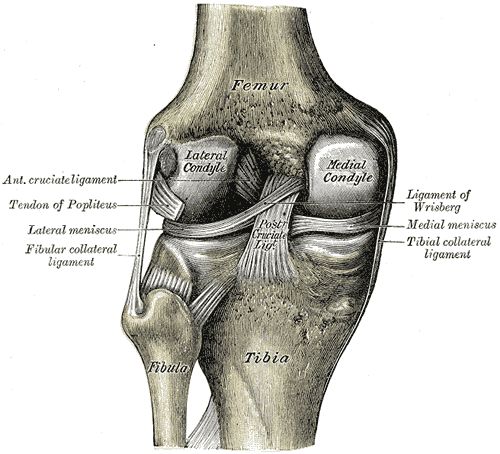
- Left knee-joint, posterior aspect, showing interior ligaments. (Fibular collateral ligament labeled at center left.)

Details
- From: Lateral epicondyle of the femur
- To: Head of the fibula

Identifiers
- Latin: ligamentum collaterale fibulare, ligamentum collaterale laterale
- TA98: A03.6.08.011
- TA2: 1895
- FMA: 9660

The lateral collateral ligament (LCL, long external lateral ligament or fibular collateral ligament) is an extrinsic ligament of the knee located on the lateral side of the knee. Its superior attachment is at the lateral epicondyle of the femur (superoposterior to the popliteal groove); its inferior attachment is at the lateral aspect of the head of fibula (anterior to the apex). The LCL is not fused with the joint capsule. Inferiorly, the LCL splits the tendon of insertion of the biceps femoris muscle.

== Structure ==
The LCL measures some 5 cm in length. It is rounded, and is more narrow and less broad compared to the medial collateral ligament. It extends obliquely inferoposteriorly from its superior attachment to its inferior attachment.

In contrast to the medial collateral ligament, it is not fused with either the capsular ligament nor the lateral meniscus. Because of this, the LCL is more flexible than its medial counterpart, and is therefore less susceptible to injury.

=== Relations ===
Immediately below its origin is the groove for the tendon of the popliteus.

The greater part of its lateral surface is covered by the tendon of the biceps femoris; the tendon, however, divides at its insertion into two parts, which are separated by the ligament.

Deep to the ligament are the tendon of the popliteus, and the inferior lateral genicular vessels and nerve.

== Function ==
Both collateral ligaments are taut when the knee joint is in extension. With the knee in flexion, the radius of curvatures of the condyles is decreased and the origin and insertions of the ligaments are brought closer together which make them lax. The pair of ligaments thus stabilize the knee joint in the coronal plane. Therefore, damage and rupture of these ligaments can be diagnosed by examining the knee's stability in the mediolateral axis.

== Clinical significance ==
=== Causes of injury ===
The LCL is usually injured as a result of varus force across the knee, which is a force pushing the knee from the medial (inner) side of the joint, causing stress on the outside. An example of this would be a direct blow to the inside of the knee. The LCL can also be injured by a noncontact injury, such as a hyperextension stress, again causing varus force across the knee.

An LCL injury usually occurs simultaneously as the other ligaments of the knee are injured. Multiple knee ligament tears and stresses can result from a significant trauma that includes direct blunt force to the knee, such as an automobile crash.

=== Symptoms ===
Symptoms of a sprain or tear of the LCL includes pain to the lateral aspect of the knee, instability of the knee when walking, swelling and ecchymosis (bruising) at the site of trauma. Direct trauma to the medial aspect of the knee may also affect the peroneal nerve, which could result in a foot drop or paresthesias below the knee which could present itself as a tingling sensation.

== Treatment ==
An isolated LCL tear or sprain rarely requires surgery. If the injury is a Grade 1 or Grade II, microscopic or partial macroscopic tearing respectively, the injury is treated with rest and rehabilitation. Ice, electrical stimulation and elevation are all methods to reduce the pain and swelling felt in the initial stages after the injury takes place. Physical therapy focuses on regaining full range-of-motion, such as biking, stretching and careful applications of pressure on the joint. Full recovery of Grade I or Grade II tears should take between 6 weeks and 3 months. Continued pain, swelling and instability to the joint after this time period may require surgical repair or reconstruction to the ligament.

== Additional images ==
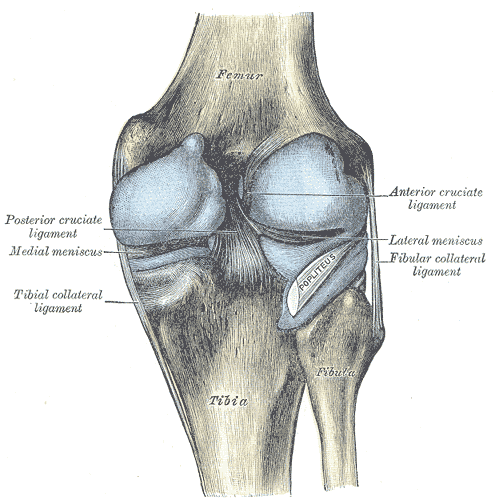
Capsule of right knee-joint (distended). Posterior aspect.

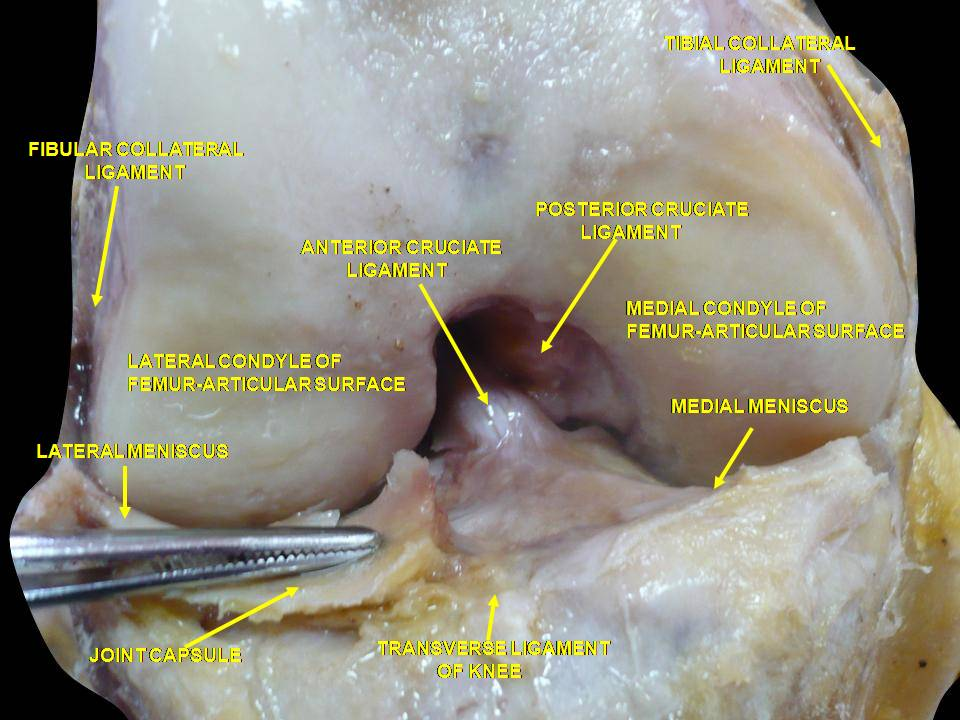
Anterior view of knee.

== See also ==
- Posterolateral knee injuries
