= Medial epicondyle of the femur =

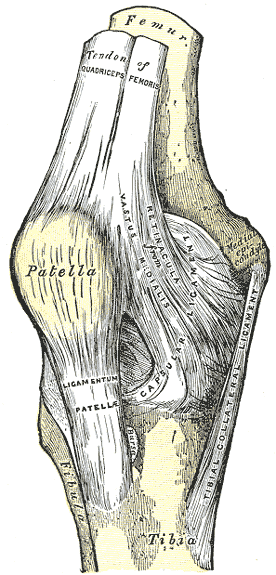
- Right knee-joint. Anterior view. (Medial epicondyle visible at right.)

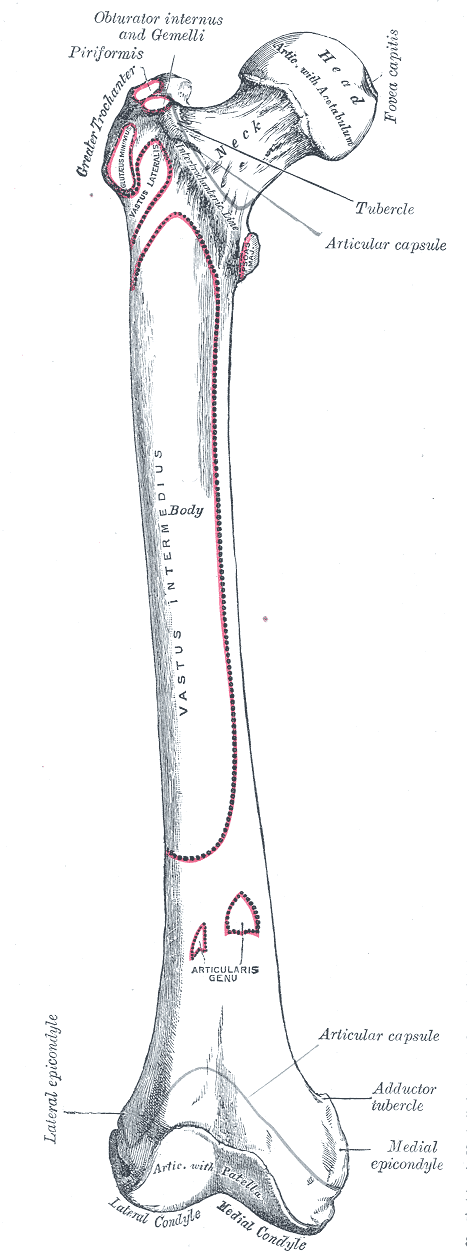
- Right femur. Anterior surface. (Medial epicondyle labeled at bottom right.)

Details

Identifiers
- Latin: epicondylus medialis femoris
- TA98: A02.5.04.022
- TA2: 1381
- FMA: 32864

The medial epicondyle of the femur is an epicondyle, a bony protrusion, located on the medial side of the femur at its distal end.

Located above the medial condyle, it bears an elevation, the adductor tubercle, which serves for the attachment of the superficial part, or "tendinous insertion", of the adductor magnus. This tendinous part here forms an intermuscular septum which forms the medial separation between the thigh's flexors and extensors.

Behind it, and proximal to the medial condyle is a rough impression which gives origin to the medial head of the Gastrocnemius.

== See also ==
- Lateral epicondyle of the femur
- Medial epicondyle of the humerus

== Additional images ==
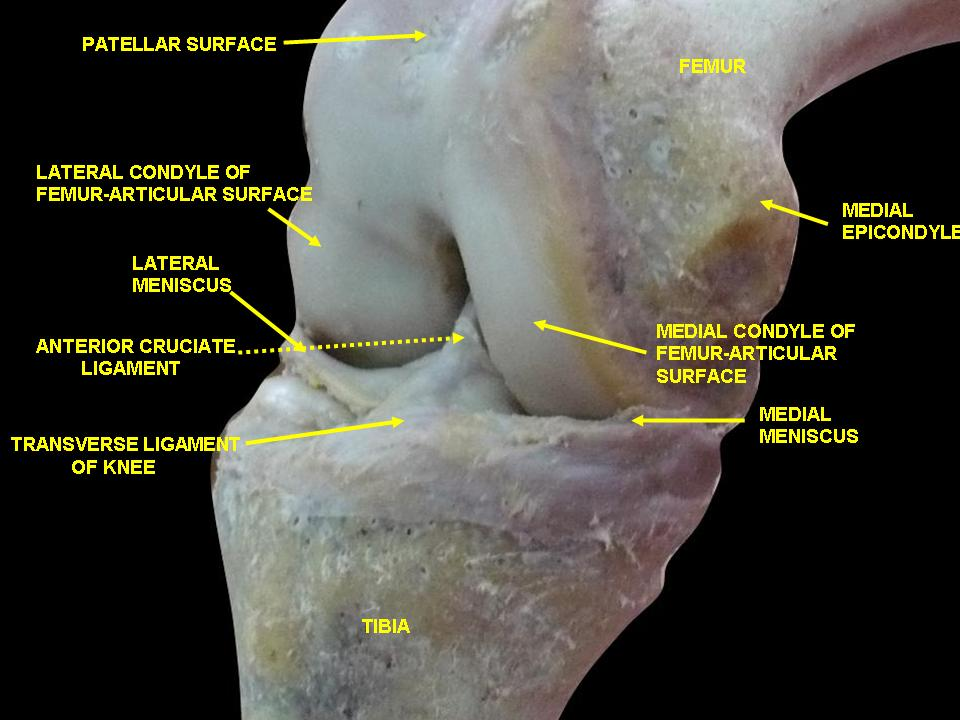
Knee joint. Deep dissection. Anteromedial view.

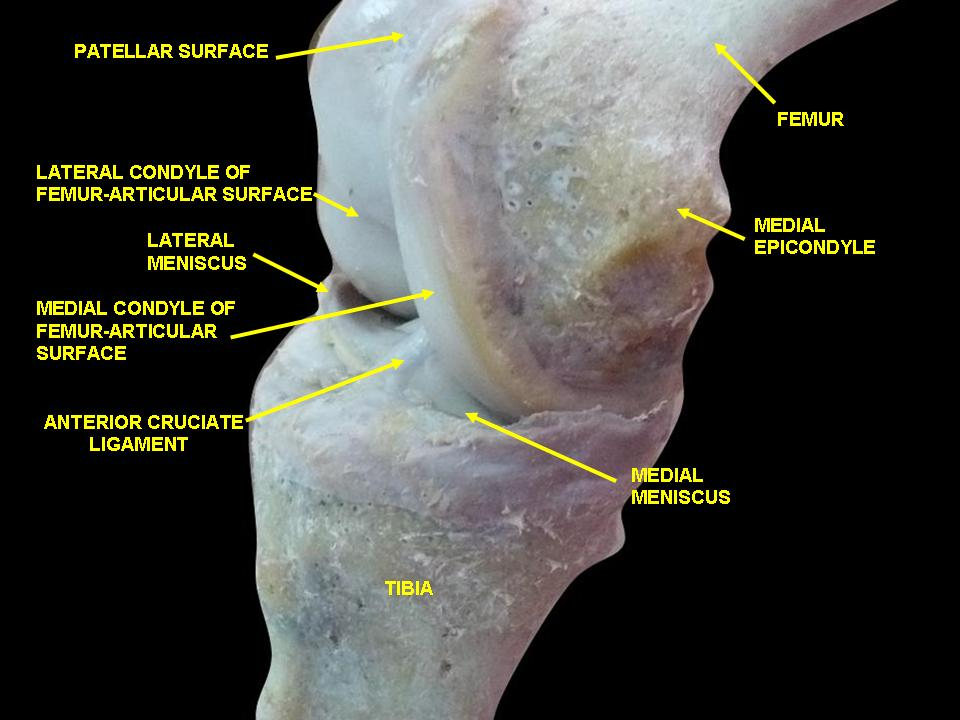
Knee joint. Deep dissection. Anteromedial view.

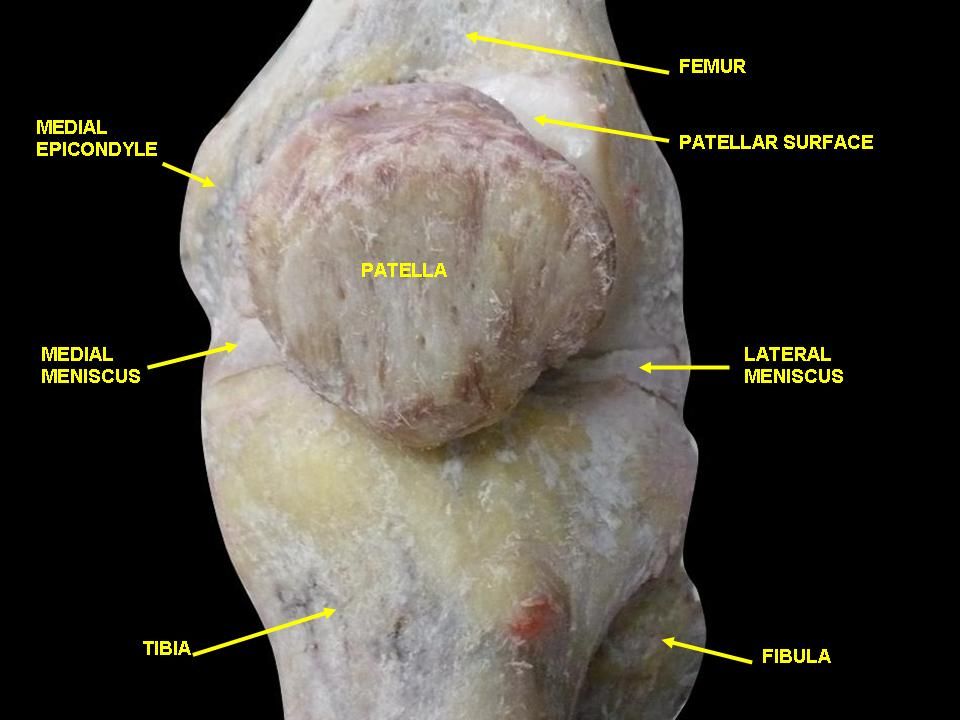
Knee joint. Deep dissection. Anteromedial view.

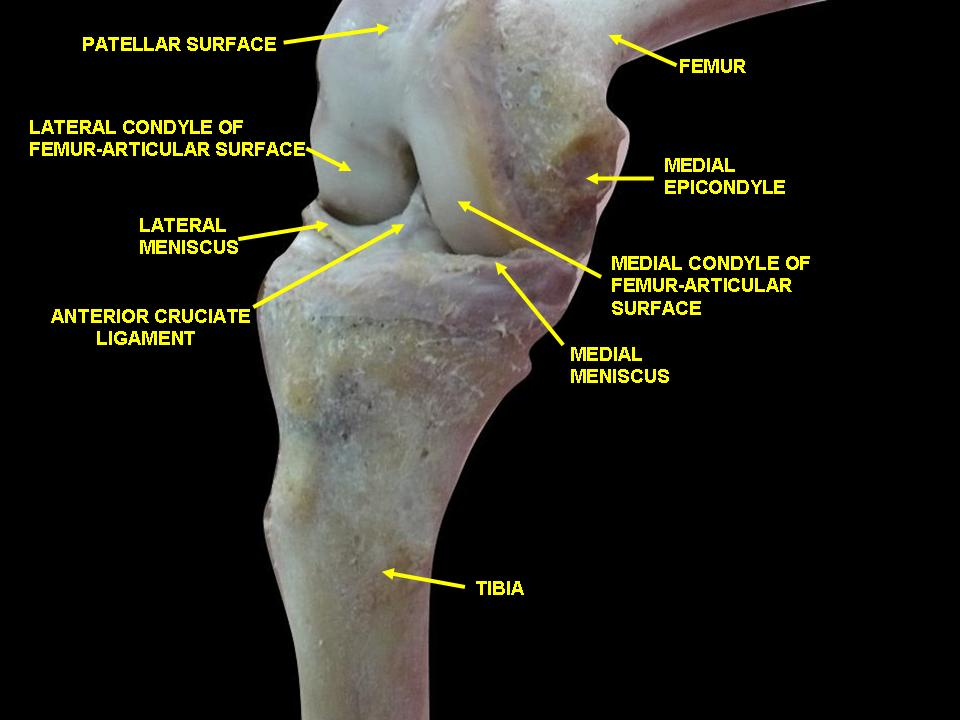
Knee joint. Deep dissection. Anteromedial view.
