= Medial condyle of femur =

Projection on the femur

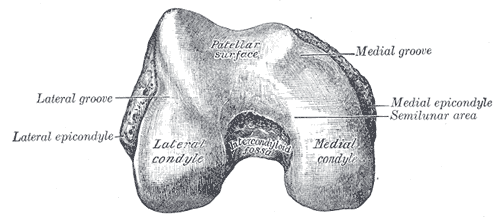
- Lower extremity of right femur viewed from below.

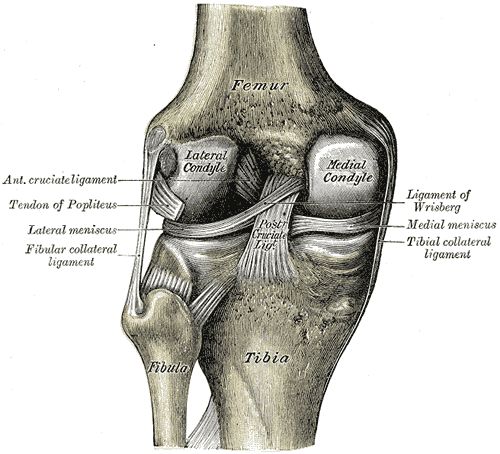
- Left knee-joint from behind, showing interior ligaments.

Details

Identifiers
- Latin: condylus medialis femoris
- TA98: A02.5.04.021
- TA2: 1380
- FMA: 32858

The medial condyle is one of the two projections on the lower extremity of femur, the other being the lateral condyle.

The medial condyle is larger than the lateral (outer) condyle due to more weight bearing caused by the centre of mass being medial to the knee. On the posterior surface of the condyle the linea aspera (a ridge with two lips: medial and lateral; running down the posterior shaft of the femur) turns into the medial and lateral supracondylar ridges, respectively. The outermost protrusion on the medial surface of the medial condyle is referred to as the "medial epicondyle" and can be palpated by running fingers medially from the patella with the knee in flexion. It is important to take into consideration the difference in the length of the condyles in a cross section to better understand the geometry of the knee. The medial femoral condyle has an extra segment which is the cause for the passive rotation of the knee joint.

== Additional images ==
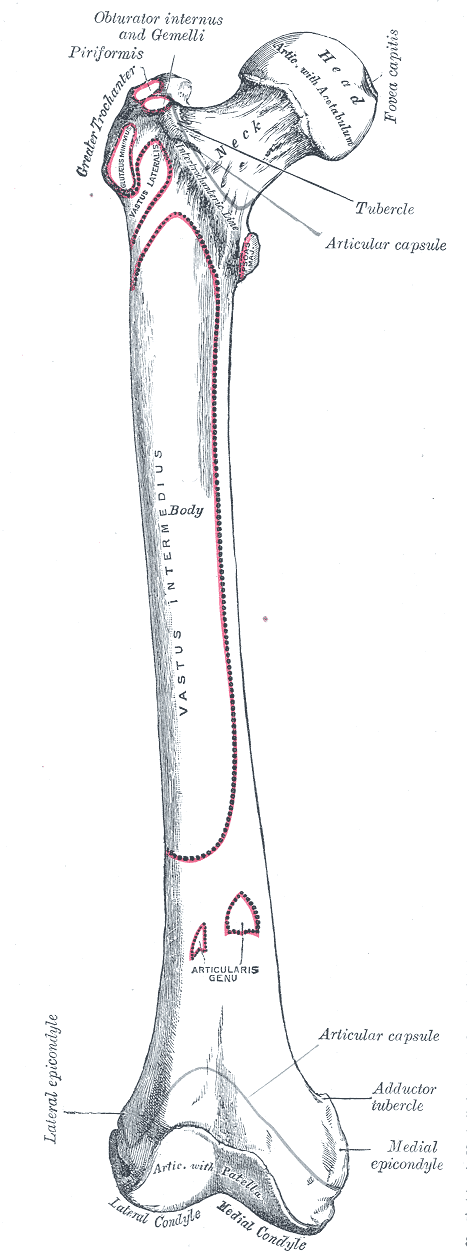
Right femur. Anterior surface.

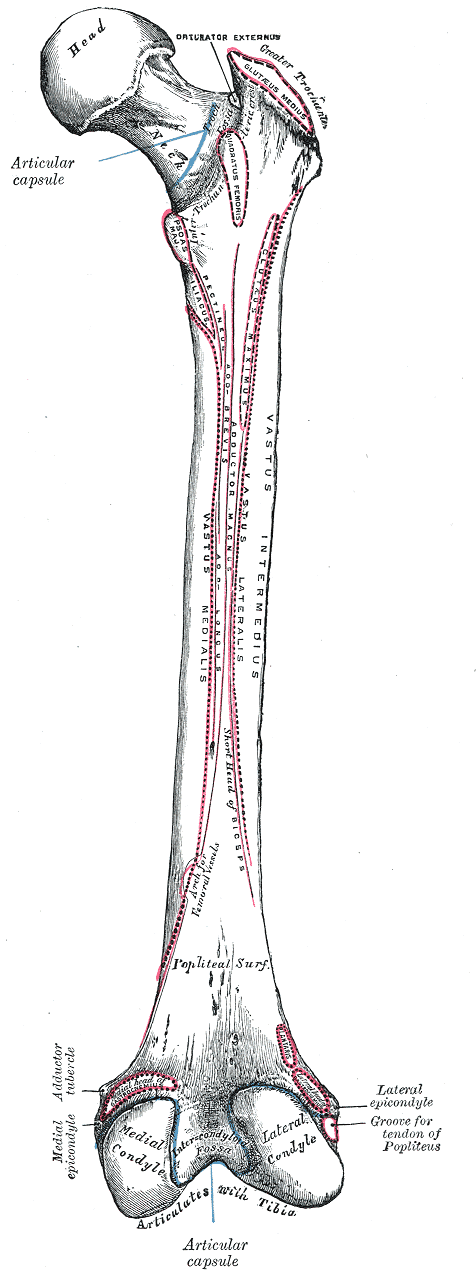
Right femur. Posterior surface.

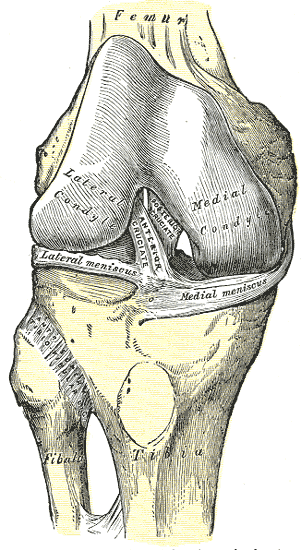
Right knee-joint, from the front, showing interior ligaments.

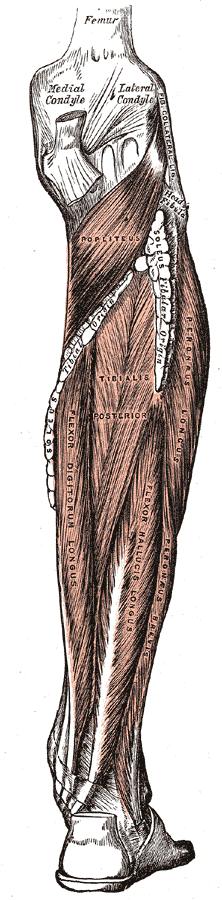
Muscles of the back of the leg. Deep layers.

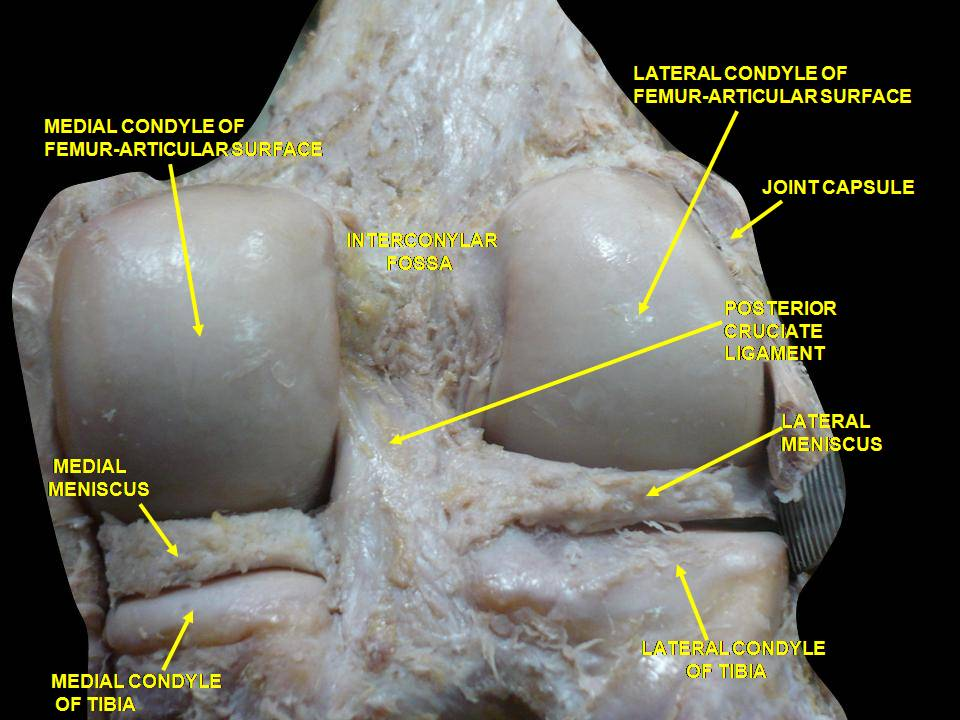
Right knee in extension. Deep dissection. Posterior view.
