= Lateral condyle of femur =

Projection on the femur

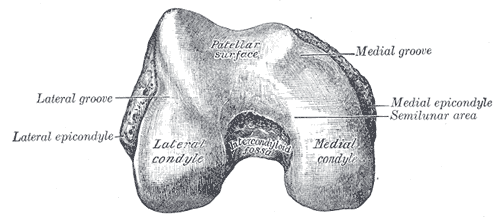
- Lower extremity of right femur viewed from below.

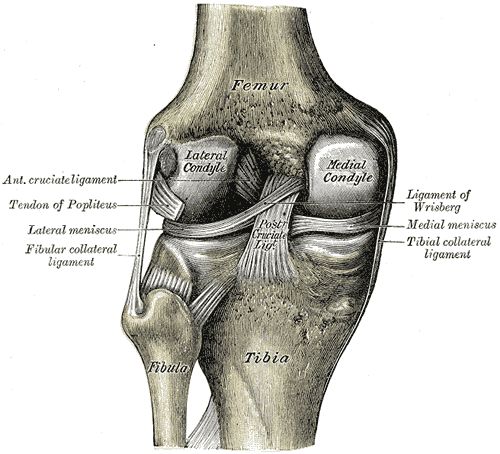
- Left knee-joint from behind, showing interior ligaments.

Details

Identifiers
- Latin: condylus lateralis femoris
- TA98: A02.5.04.024
- TA2: 1383
- FMA: 32859

The lateral condyle is one of the two projections on the lower extremity of the femur. The other one is the medial condyle. The lateral condyle is the more prominent and is broader both in its front-to-back and transverse diameters.

== Clinical significance ==
The most common injury to the lateral femoral condyle is an osteochondral fracture combined with a patellar dislocation. The osteochondral fracture occurs on the weight-bearing portion of the lateral condyle. Typically, the condyle will fracture (and the patella may dislocate) as a result of severe impaction from activities such as downhill skiing and parachuting.

Open reduction and internal fixation surgery is typically used to repair an osteochondral fracture. For a AO Type B1 partial articular fracture of the lateral condyle, interfragmentary lag screws are used to secure the bone back together. Supplementation of buttress screws or a buttress plate is used if the fracture extends to the proximal metaphysis or distal diaphysis.

== Additional images ==
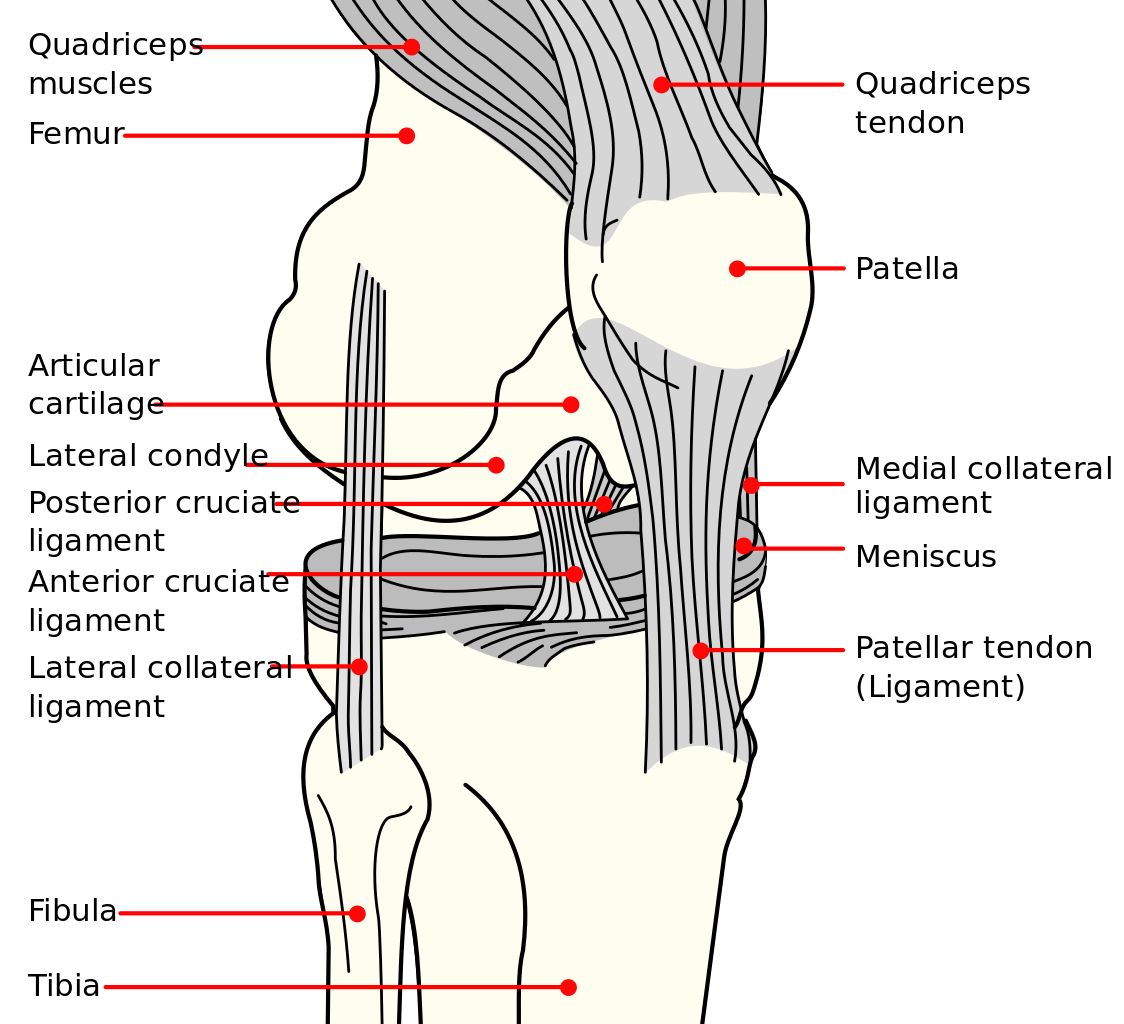
Knee diagram

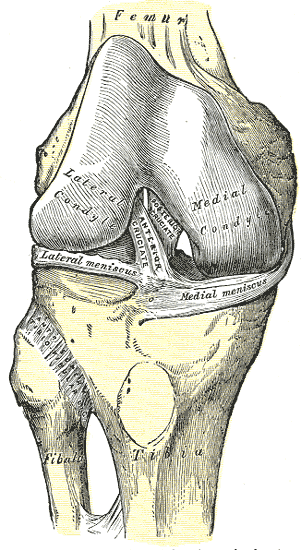
Right knee-joint, from the front, showing interior ligaments.

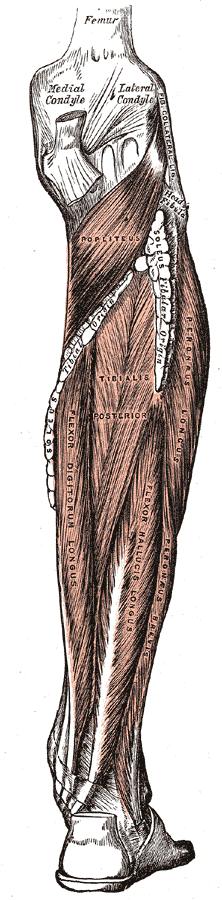
Muscles of the back of the leg. Deep layer.

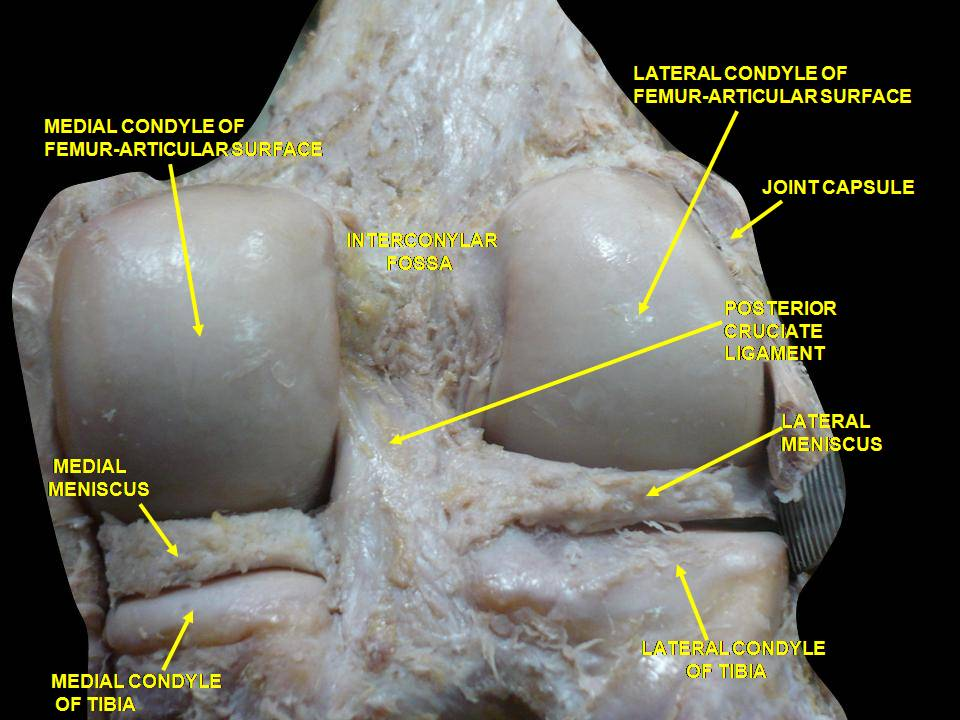
Right knee in extension. Deep dissection. Posterior view.
