= Lateral epicondyle of the femur =

Extension of the thigh bone that secures the knee

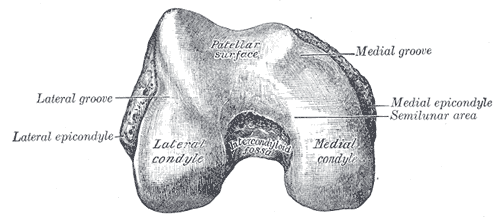
- Lower extremity of right femur viewed from below. (Lateral epicondyle visible at left.)

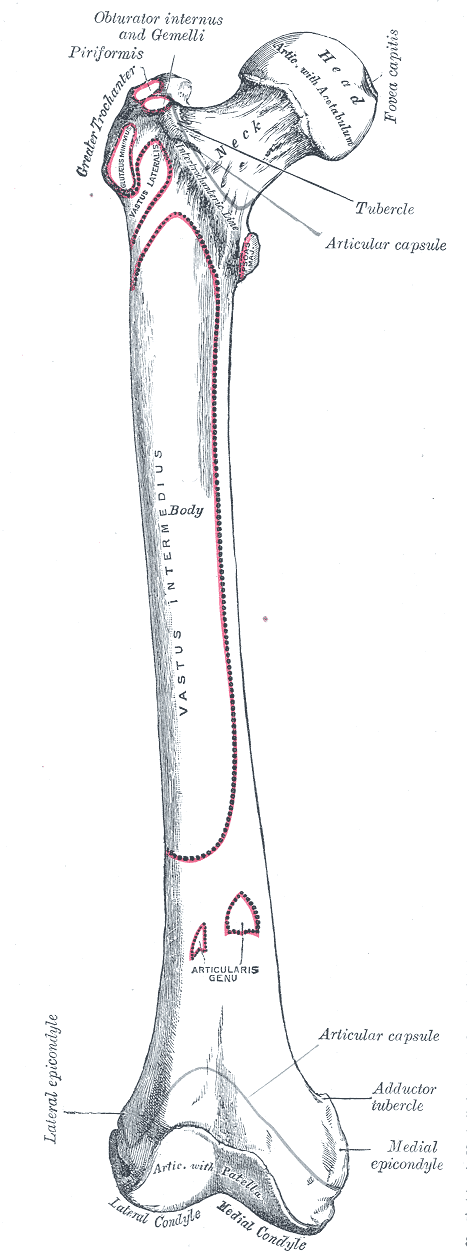
- Right femur. Anterior surface. (Lateral epicondyle labeled at bottom left.)

Details

Identifiers
- Latin: epicondylus lateralis femoris
- TA98: A02.5.04.025
- TA2: 1384
- FMA: 32867

The lateral epicondyle of the femur, smaller and less prominent than the medial epicondyle, gives attachment to the fibular collateral ligament of the knee-joint. Directly below it is a small depression from which a smooth well-marked groove curves obliquely upward and backward to the posterior extremity of the condyle.
