= Obturator =

Obturator may refer to:

== Medicine ==
=== Anatomical structures ===
- Obturator foramen
- Obturator fascia
- Obturator canal
- Obturator vessels (disambiguation)
  - Obturator artery
  - Obturator veins
- Obturator nerve
  - Anterior branch of obturator nerve
  - Posterior branch of obturator nerve
  - Cutaneous branch of the obturator nerve
- Obturator internus nerve
- Accessory obturator nerve
- Obturator membrane
- Obturator crest
- Obturator muscles (disambiguation)
  - Obturator internus muscle
  - Obturator externus muscle
- Obturator externus groove
- Obturator process (in archosaurs)

=== Diseases and disorders ===
- Obturator hernia

=== Medical procedures ===
- Obturator sign

=== Medical devices ===
- Part of a trocar device
- A device used as a guide during tracheostomy tube insertion
- Palatal obturator, a dental prosthesis used to seal an opening in the palate, i.e. cleft palate

== Botany ==
- Part of the ovary of a flower that chemically guides the pollen tube to the micropyle

== Engineering ==
- Obturator ring, a part in early aircraft engines
- Obturating ring, used particularly in artillery to form a seal when pressure is applied
