= Obturator vessels =

Obturator vessels can refer to:

- Obturator artery
- Obturator veins

See also Obturator canal
