= Acetabular fossa =

Depression within the hip joint cavity (acetabulum)

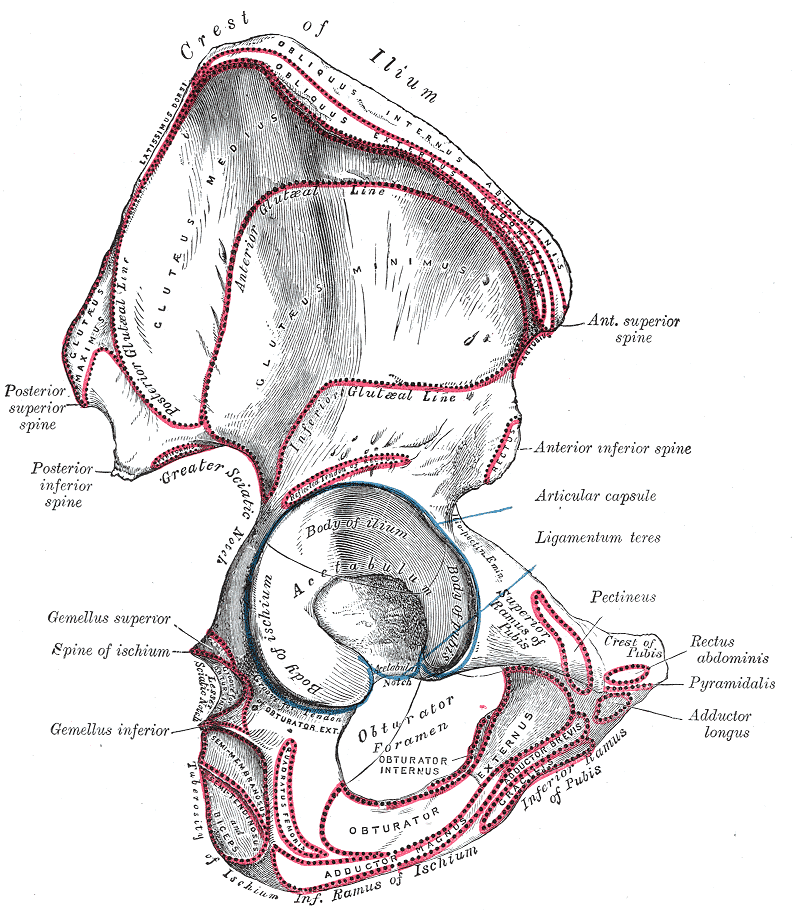
- Lateral view of the right hip bone

Details

Identifiers
- Latin: fossa acetabuli
- TA98: A02.5.01.004
- TA2: 1310
- FMA: 17269

The acetabular fossa is the non-articular depressed region at the centre of the floor of the acetabulum. It is surrounded by the articular lunate surface. The floor of the fossa is formed mostly by the ischium; it is rough and thin (often to the point of transparency). The space of the fossa is continuous inferiorly with the acetabular notch.

The fossa does not contain any cartilage. It is occupied by the ligament of head of femur, and by fibroelastic adipose tissue (within which the acetabular branch of the obturator artery ramifies) that is mostly lined with synovial membrane. The acetabular "fat pad" is thought to contain abundant proprioceptive nerve endings that sense compression of the fat pad or its displacement through the acetabular notch, producing proprioceptive information.

== Additional images ==
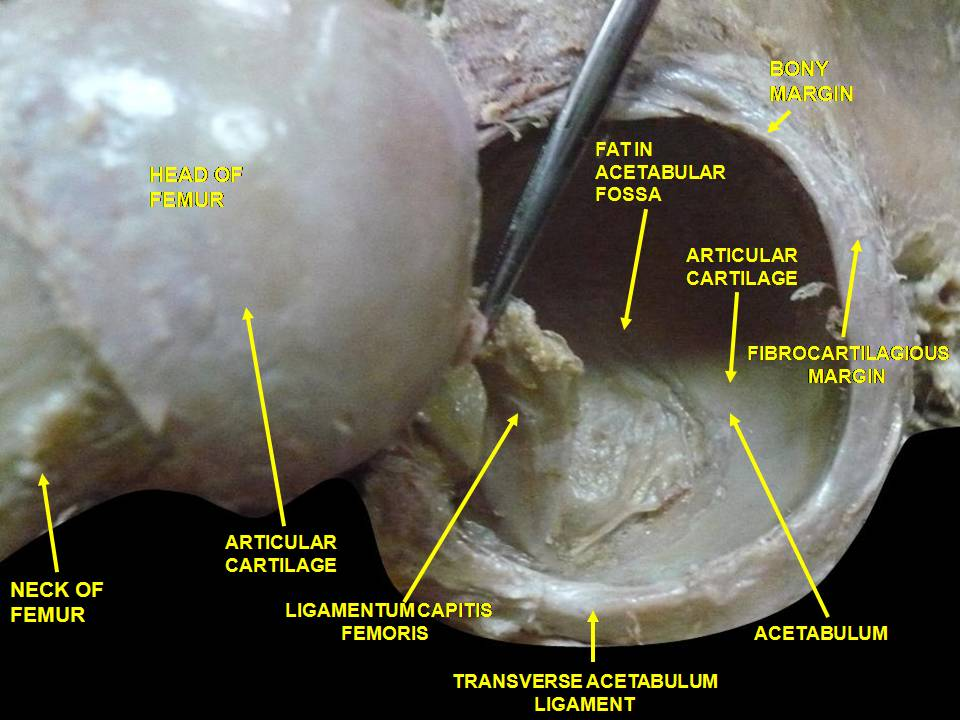
Hip joint. Lateral view. Fat in acetabular fossa.
