= Obturator crest =

Anatomical bone landmark

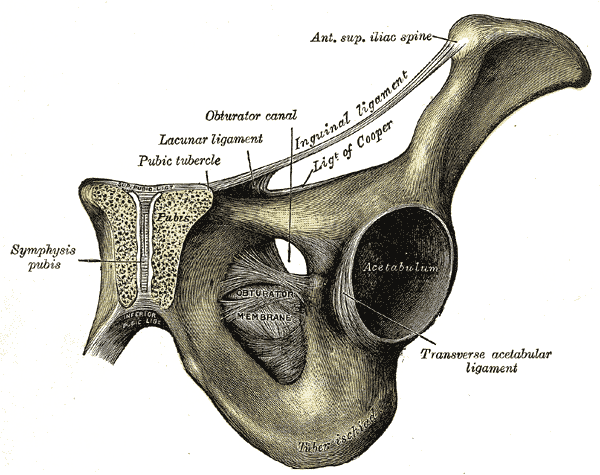
- The obturator membrane.

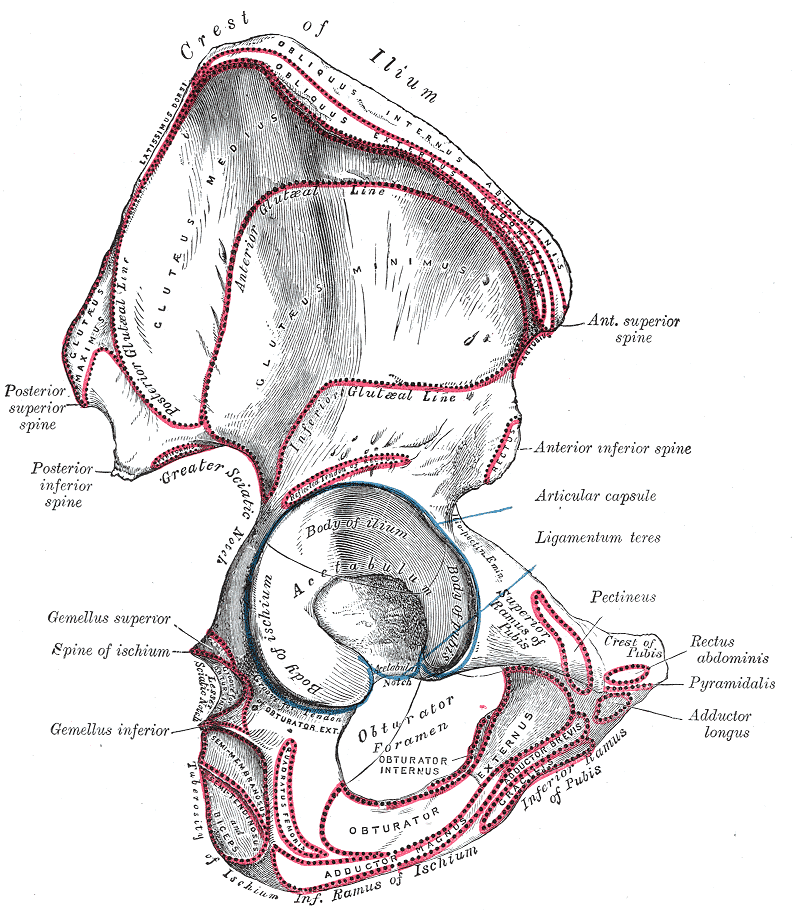
- Right hip bone. External surface.

Details

Identifiers
- Latin: crista obturatoria
- TA98: A02.5.01.309
- TA2: 1354
- FMA: 16976

The anterior border of the superior pubic ramus presents a sharp margin, the obturator crest, which forms part of the circumference of the obturator foramen superiorly and affords attachment to the obturator membrane.

The obturator crest extends from the pubic tubercle to the acetabular notch.
