= Proximodorsal process =

Anatomical feature on the skeletons of archosaurs

The proximodorsal process is a feature of the skeleton of archosaurs. It may be a pair of tabs or blade-shaped flanges on the pelvis, and serves as an anchor point for the attachment of leg muscles. This process is of particular importance in the anatomy and comparative morphology of Mesozoic birds and advanced maniraptoran dinosaurs. The pelvis is made up of three paired bones and a sacrum. The three paired bones are called the ilium, the ischium, and the pubis. On the ischium there may be an obturator process and/or a proximodorsal process. The more primitive condition is for there to be no proximodorsal process, but a large obturator process. In primitive birds the ischia are complex, usually with a small or even absent obturator process and a large, rectangular, proximodorsal process extending up toward the ilium. This is the condition in Archaeopteryx, Confuciusornis, and enantiornithines. The South American dromaeosaurs called the unenlagiinae have an intermediate condition between the two, with both a large obturator process and a proximodorsal process.

== See also ==
- Epipubic bones
- Evolution of mammals
