= Lunate surface of acetabulum =

Region of the pelvis which the femur moves against in the hip joint

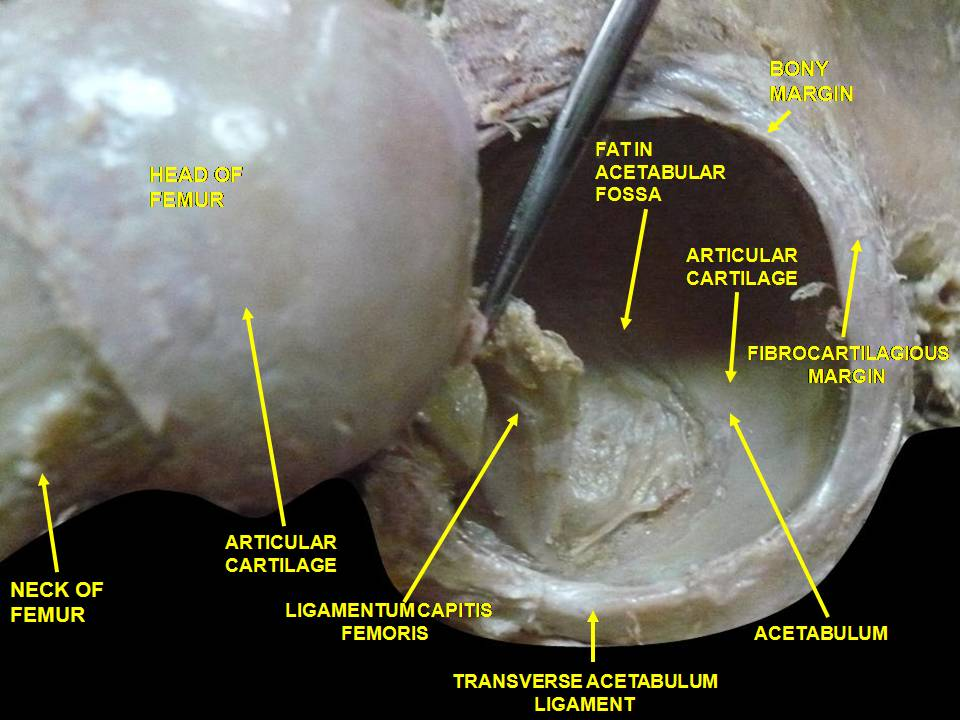

Details

Identifiers
- Latin: facies lunata acetabuli
- TA98: A02.5.01.006
- TA2: 1312
- FMA: 43524

The lunate surface of acetabulum is the articular surface of the acetabulum which makes contact with the femoral head as part of the hip joint. It forms an incomplete ring that is deficient inferiorly - opposite the acetabular notch. The lunate surface surrounds the central, non-articular depression - the acetabular fossa - which does not make contact with the femoral head in the articulated hip joint.

Its surface consists of articular cartilage. It is widest (and the cartilage thickest) anterosuperiorly where weight is transmitted from the lower limb in an upright position; it is narrowest at its pubic portion.
