= Transverse acetabular ligament =

Ligament of the hip

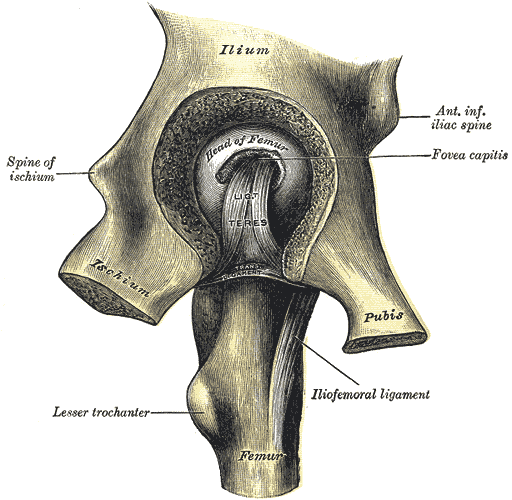
- Left hip-joint, opened by removing the floor of the acetabulum from within the pelvis. (Trans. ligament labeled at center.)

Details

Identifiers
- Latin: ligamentum transversum acetabuli
- TA98: A03.6.07.009
- TA2: 1881
- FMA: 43518

The transverse acetabular ligament (transverse ligament or Tunstall's ligament) bridges the acetabular notch, creating the a foramen (through which blood vessels and nerves pass into the joint cavity). The ligament is one of the sites of attachment of the ligament of head of femur.

Some sources consider the transverse acetabular ligament as the part of the acetabular labrum over the acetabular notch, while another states that the labrum attaches onto the ligament.

== Additional images ==
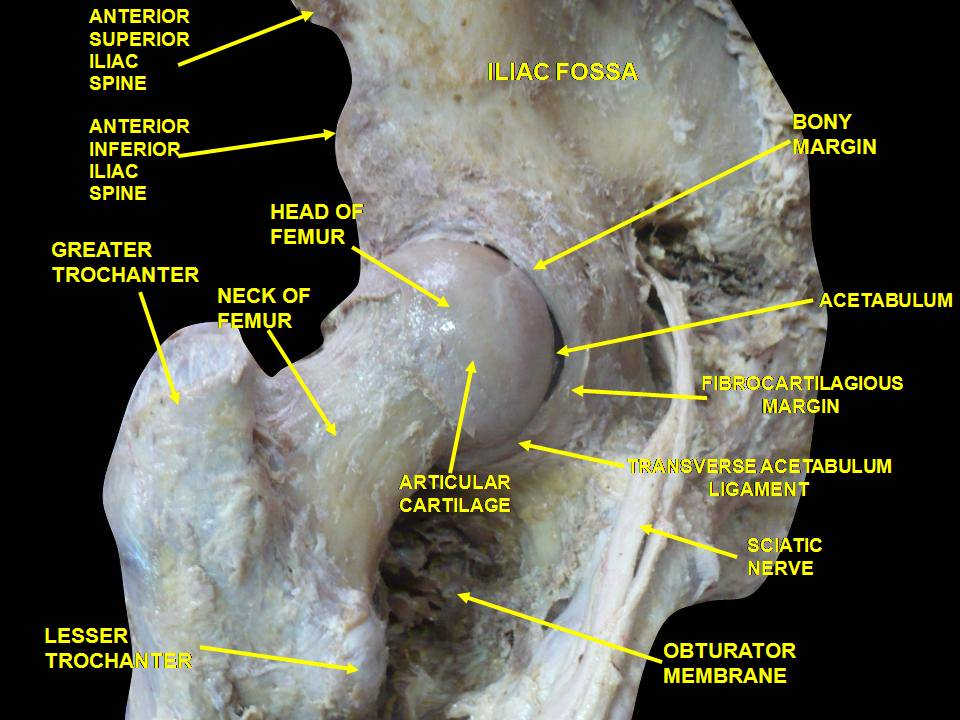
Hip joint. Lateral view. Transverse acetabular ligament

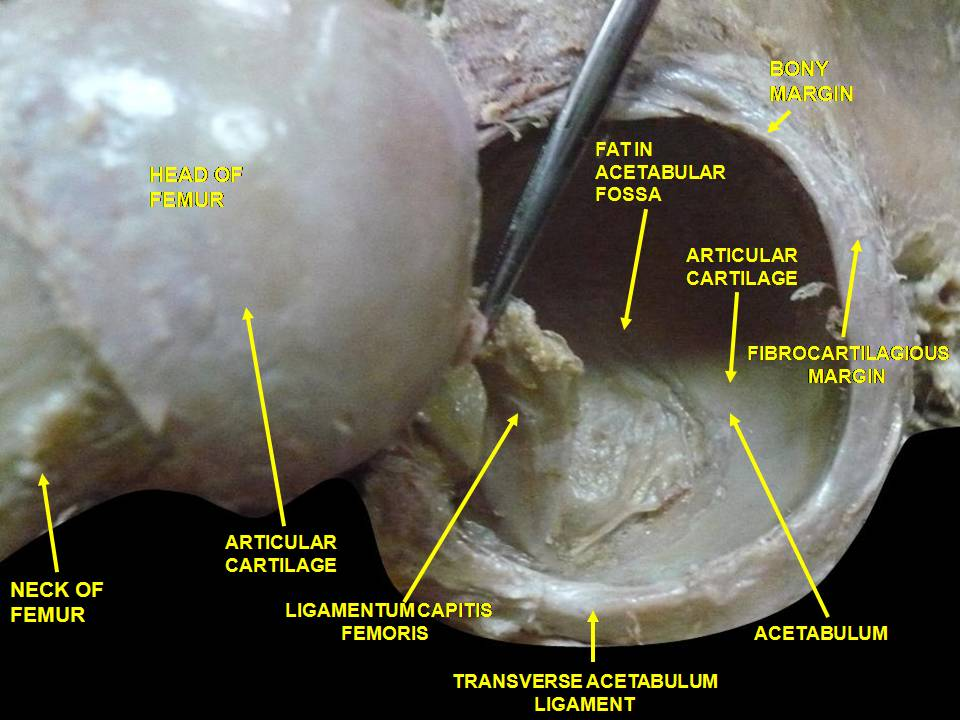
Hip joint. Lateral view. Transverse acetabular ligament
