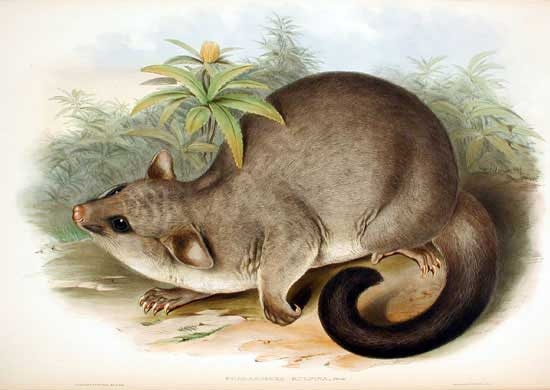
- Common brushtail possum by John Gould, 1863

Scientific classification
- Kingdom: Animalia
- Phylum: Chordata
- Class: Mammalia
- Infraclass: Marsupialia
- Order: Diprotodontia
- Family: Phalangeridae
- Genus: Trichosurus; Lesson, 1828

Type species
- Didelphis vulpecula (Kerr, 1792)

Species
- see text

= Brushtail possum =

Brushtail possums

Genus of marsupials

The brushtail possums are the members of the genus Trichosurus in the Phalangeridae, a family of marsupials. They are native to Australia (including Tasmania) and some small nearby islands. Unique among marsupials, they have shifted the hypaxial muscles from the epipubic to the pelvis, much like in placental mammals, meaning that their breathing cycle is more similar to the latter than to that of other non-eutherian mammals. In general, they are more terrestrially oriented than other possums, and in some ways might parallel primates.

The genus contains these species:

- Northern brushtail possum, T. arnhemensis
- Short-eared possum, T. caninus
- Mountain brushtail possum, T. cunninghami
- Coppery brushtail possum, T. johnstonii
- Common brushtail possum, T. vulpecula

== Nest Boxes ==
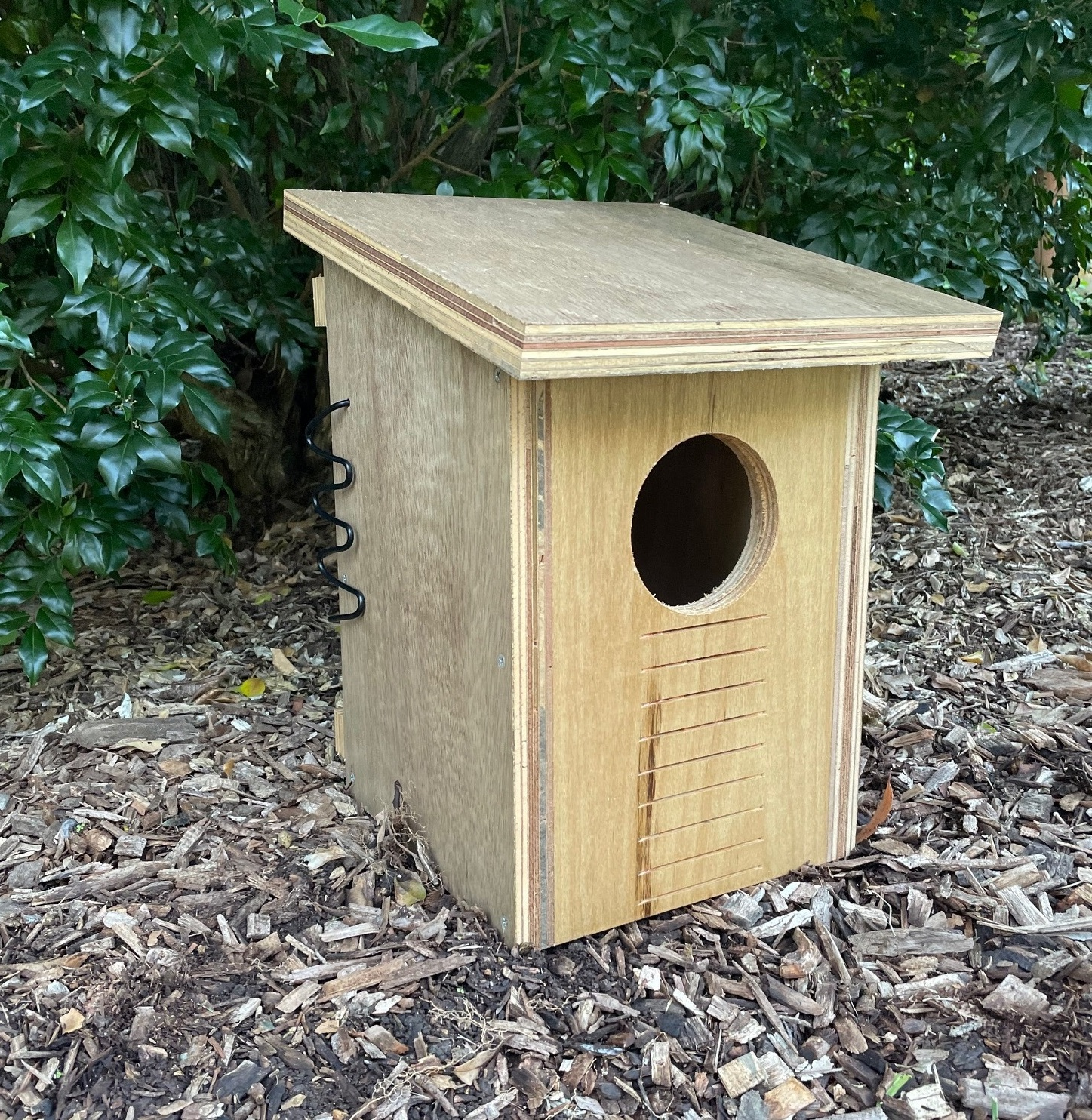
Brushtail possums nest in natural tree hollows that occur over many, many years to create a void that animals then find and use. With the loss of more and more large trees in suburban areas, nest boxes act as a hollow tree alternatives to provide an instant space for native animals to call home.

Brushtail possums nest in natural tree hollows that occur over many, many years to create a void that animals then find and use. With the loss of more and more large trees in suburban areas, nest boxes act as a hollow tree alternatives to provide an instant space for native animals to call home.

== Gallery ==
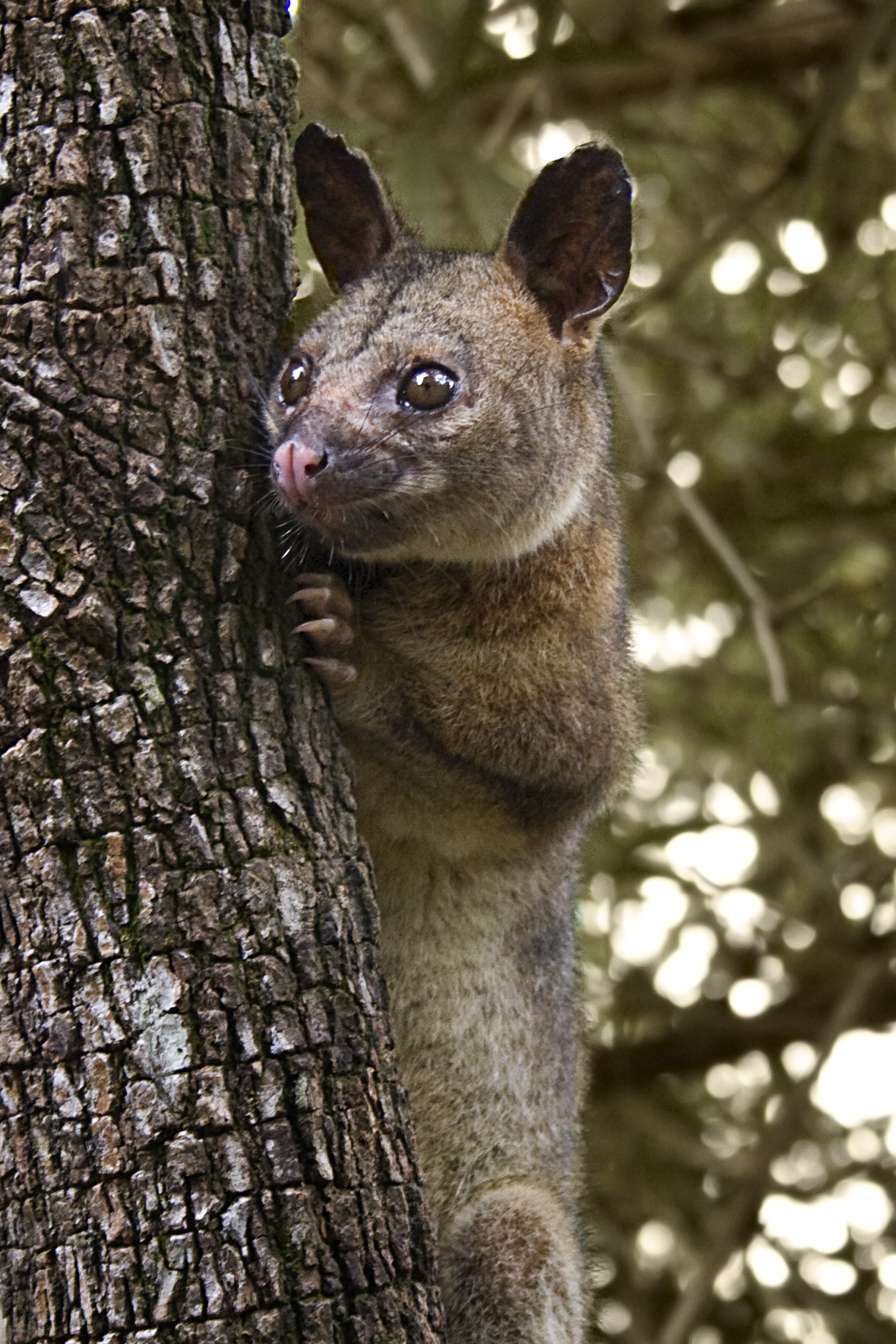
Northern brushtail possum (T. arnhemensis)

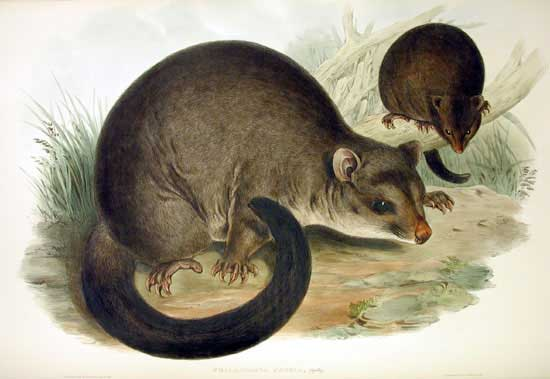
Short-eared possum (T. caninus)

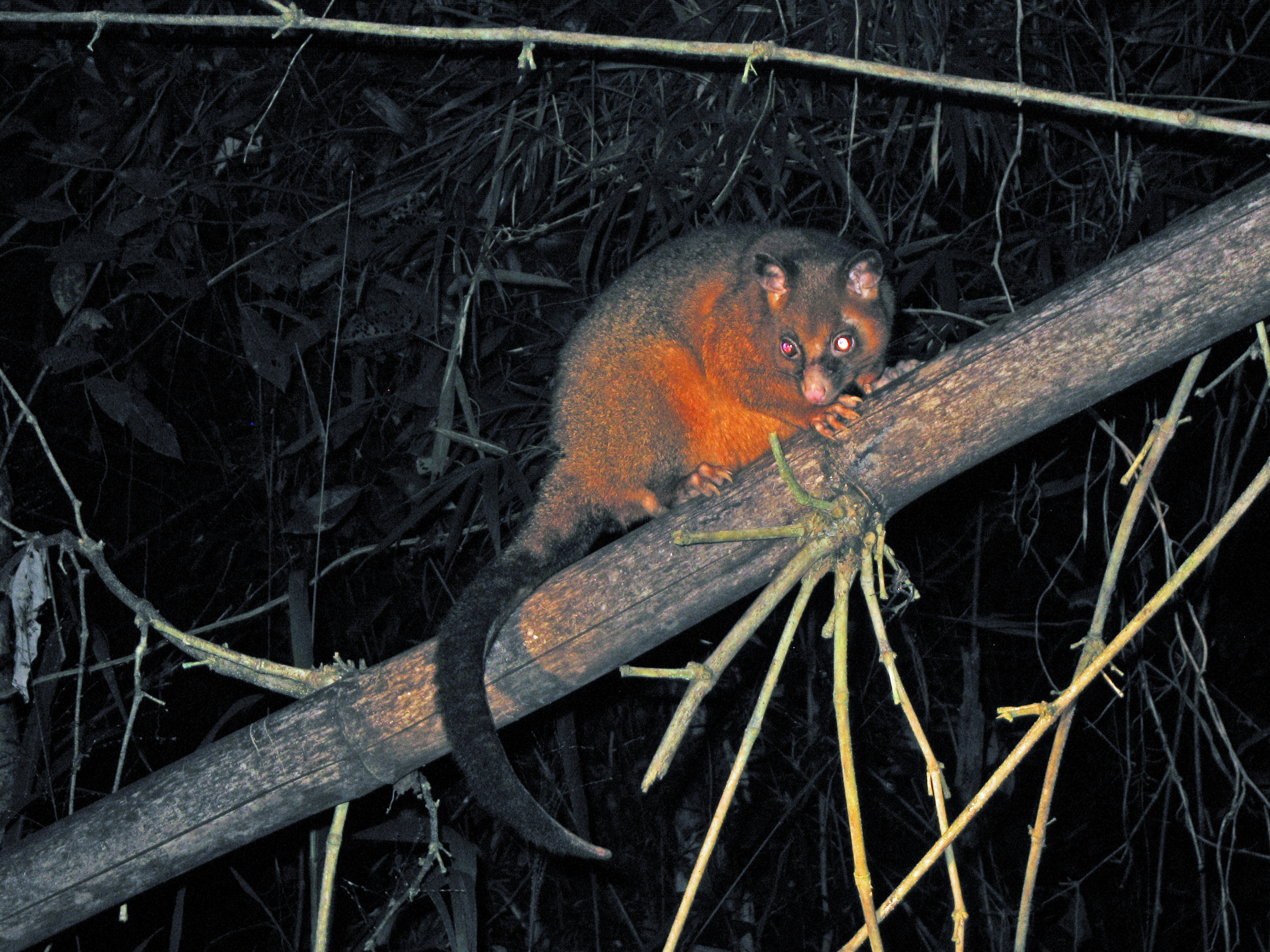
Coppery brushtail possum (T. johnstonii)

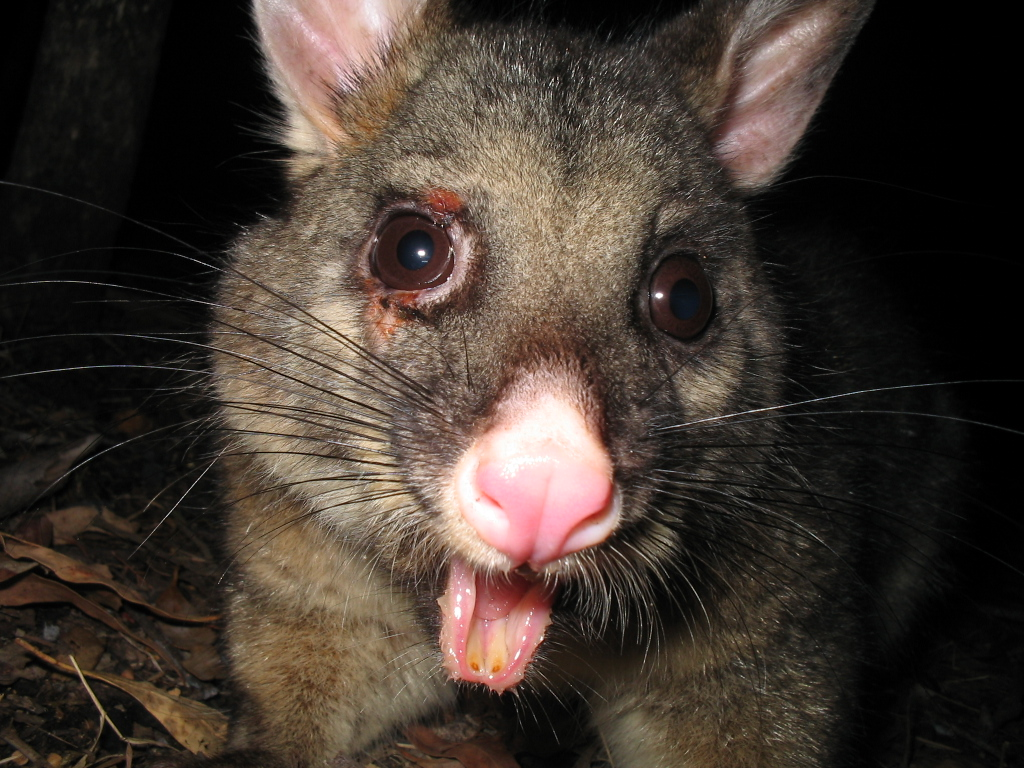
Common brushtail possum (T. vulpecula)
