= Trochanteric fossa =

Indentation in the thigh bone

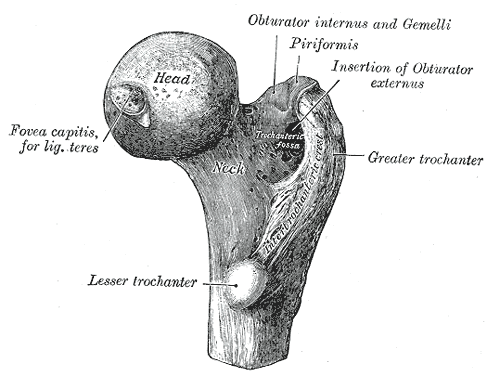
- Posterior view of right femoral epiphysis (trochanteric fossa labeled in dark portion near center right.)

Details

Identifiers
- Latin: fossa trochanterica
- TA98: A02.5.04.006
- TA2: 1365
- FMA: 43703

In mammals including humans, the medial surface of the greater trochanter has at its base a deep depression bounded posteriorly by the intertrochanteric crest, called the trochanteric fossa. This fossa is the point of insertion of four muscles. Moving from the inferior-most to the superior-most, they are: the tendon of the obturator externus muscle, the obturator internus, the superior gemellus and inferior gemellus. The width and depth of the trochanteric fossa varies taxonomically.

In reptiliomorphs such as Seymouria or Diadectes and basal reptiles such as Pareiasaurus, the trochanteric fossa (also known as the intertrochanteric fossa) is a very large depression on the ventral/posterior side of the femur. It is bounded medially by the internal trochanter (also known as the lesser trochanter), laterally by the posterior branch of the ventral ridge, and inferiorly by the convergence of the anterior and posterior branches of the ventral ridge and the adductor ridge. In these taxa, the trochanteric fossa is the insertion point for the puboischiofemoralis externus muscle.

In turtles, the intertrochanteric fossa is bounded anteriorly by the trochanter minor (sometimes called the lesser trochanter) and posteriorly by the trochanter major (sometimes called the greater trochanter; neither of these structures is likely homologous to the greater or lesser trochanter in mammals). Often, the intertrochanteric fossa is small and shallow due to the expansion of the two trochanters.

In lepidosaurs, the intertrochanteric fossa is shallow but broad. It is bounded medially by the internal/lesser trochanter and anterior branch of the ventral femoral ridge, and often less distinctly bounded laterally as the greater trochanter and posterior branch of the ventral ridge are highly reduced or absent.

In archosaurs and especially in dinosaurs, the intertrochanteric fossa is highly developed as both the internal/lesser trochanter and the greater trochanter are better developed. In dinosaurs, this area serves as the insertion point of the iliofemoralis muscles (analogous to the gluteus muscles in mammals).

== See also ==
- Obturator externus groove
