= Reflected ligament =

Ligament of the abdomen

Reflected inguinal ligament
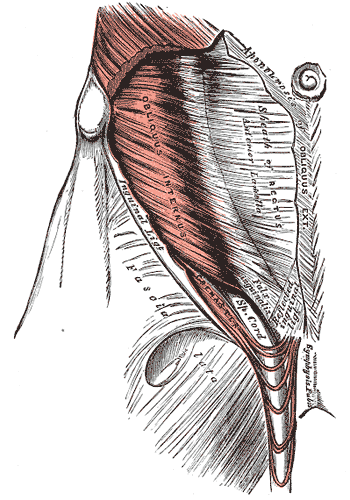
- The cremaster. (Reflected inguinal lig. labeled at bottom right.)

Details

Identifiers
- Latin: ligamentum inguinale reflexum, ligamentum reflexum
- TA98: A04.5.01.012
- TA2: 2368
- FMA: 20187

The reflected inguinal ligament (triangular fascia) is a layer of tendinous fibers of a triangular shape, formed by an expansion from the lacunar ligament and the inferior crus of the subcutaneous inguinal ring.

It passes medialward behind the spermatic cord, and expands into a somewhat fan-shaped band, lying behind the superior crus of the subcutaneous inguinal ring, and in front of the inguinal aponeurotic falx, and interlaces with the ligament of the other side of the linea alba.

== See also ==
- inguinal ligament

== Additional images ==
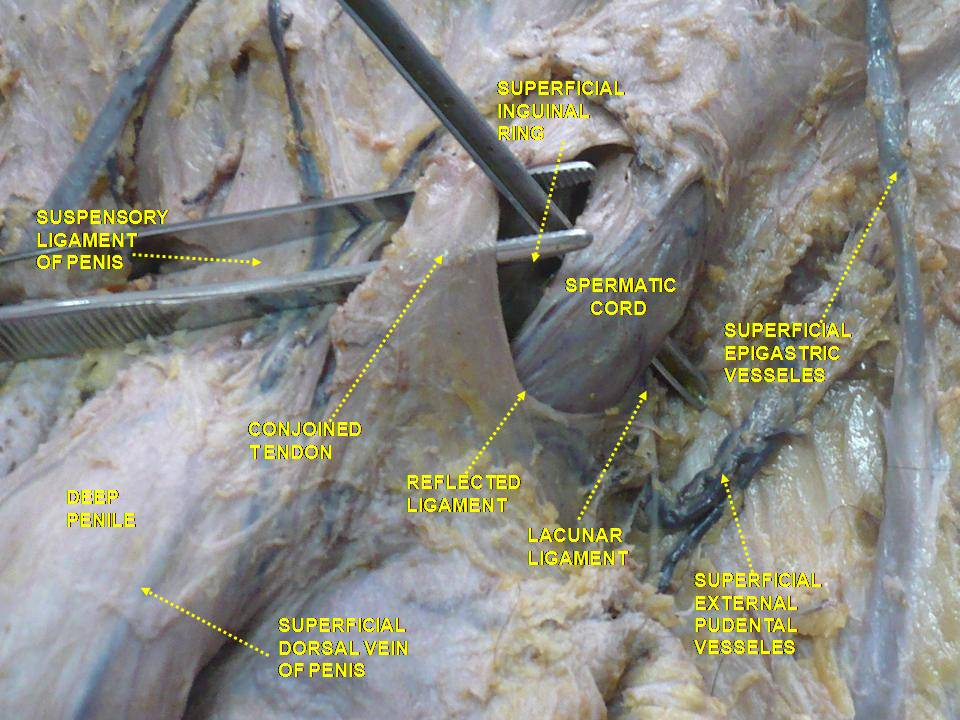
Anterior abdominal wall. Intermediate dissection. Anterior view
