= Epipubic bone =

Pair of frontal pelvic bones found in certain orders of mammals

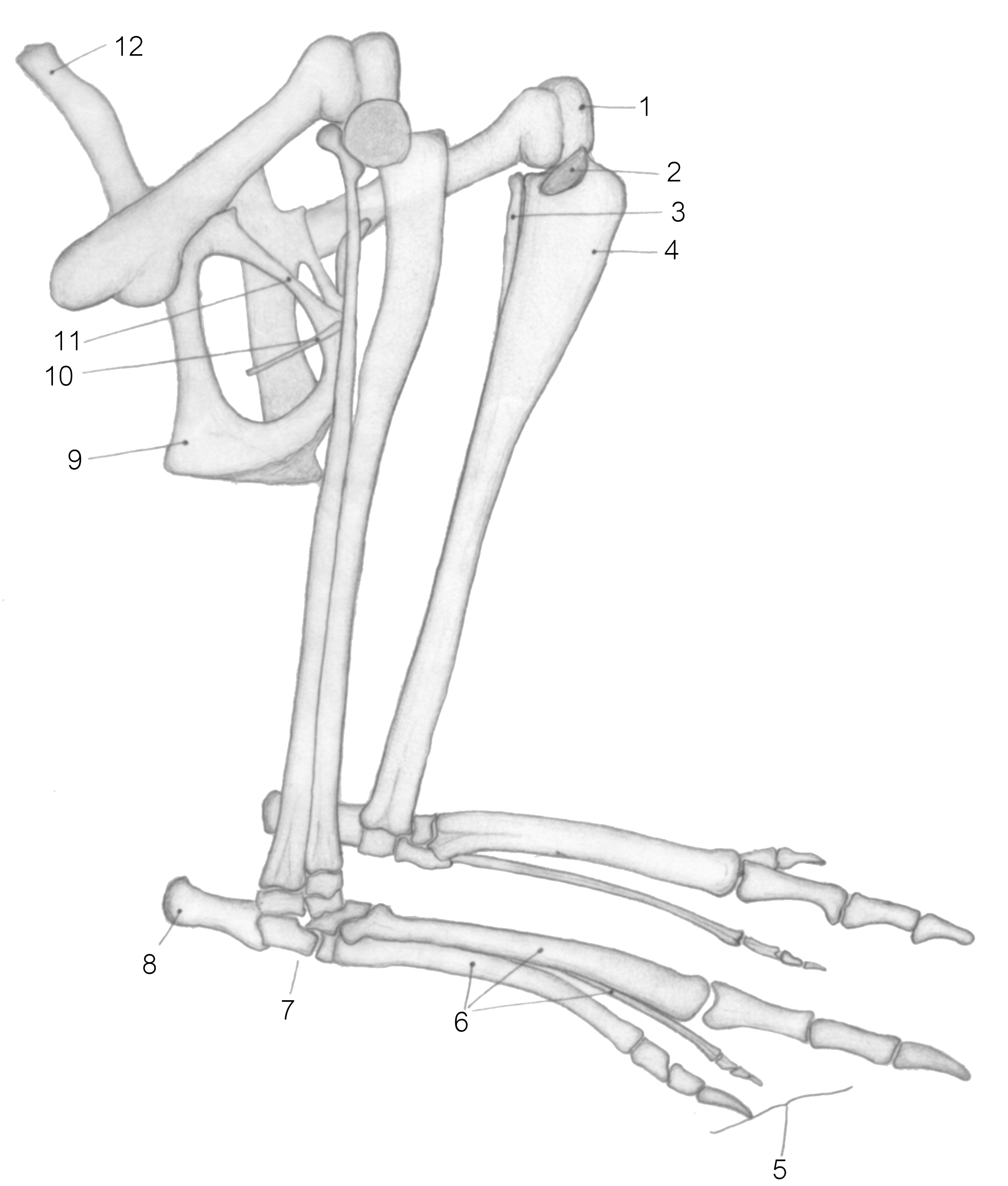
Skeleton of eastern grey kangaroo hind legs. Epipubic bones labeled as 10

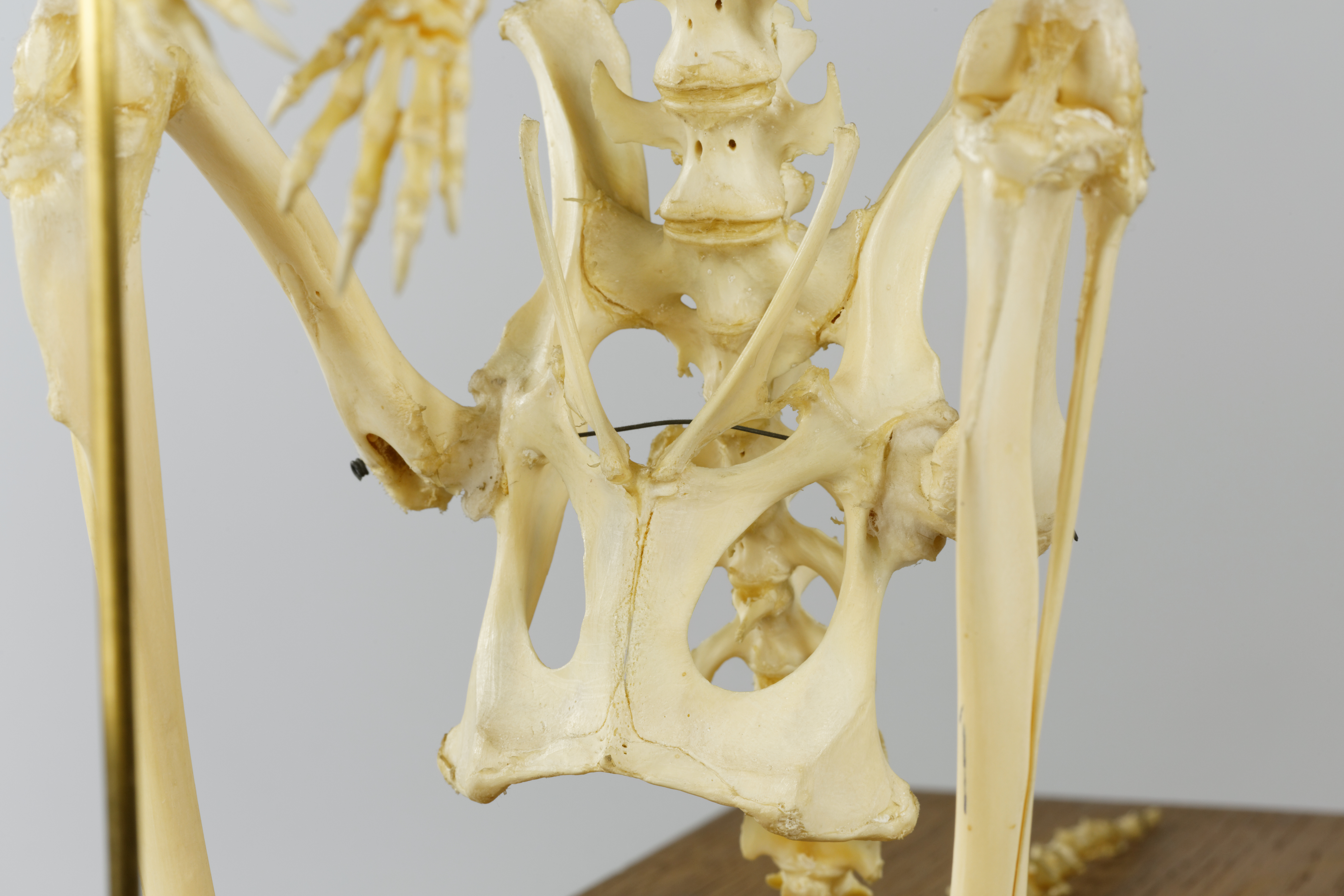
Skeleton of a red-necked wallaby, centered on the epipubic bones.

Epipubic bones are a pair of bones projecting forward from the pelvic bones of modern marsupials, monotremes and fossil mammals like multituberculates, and even basal eutherians (the ancestors of placentals, who lack them). They first occur in non-mammalian cynodonts such as tritylodontids, suggesting that they are a synapomorphy between them and Mammaliformes.

They were first described as early as 1698, but to date, their function(s) remain unresolved. Epipubic bones are often called marsupial bones because they support the mother's pouch in modern marsupials ("marsupium" is Latin for "pouch").

== Function ==
Some writers have suggested that the epipubic bones are a part of a kinetic link stretching from the femur on one side, to the ribs on the opposite side. This linkage is formed by a series of muscles: Each epipubic bone is connected to the femur by the pectineus muscle, and to the ribs and vertebrae by the pyramidalis, rectus abdominis, and external and internal obliques. According to this hypothesis, the epipubic bones act as levers to stiffen the trunk during locomotion, and aid in breathing. Others have suggested that epipubic bones may constrain asymmetrical gaits, although this appears not to be the case.

== Occurrence ==
Only placentals, and possibly the early mammaliformes Megazostrodon and Erythrotherium, lack them; in thylacines and sparassodonts, they appear to have become primarily cartilaginous and the osseous element has become strongly reduced or even absent.

Trichosurus mimicked placentals in shifting hypaxial muscles attachment sites from the epipubic to the pelvis, losing the respiratory benefits (see below), but otherwise retains large epipubics. Epipubic bones show sexual size dimorphism.

In modern marsupials, the epipubic bones are often called "marsupial bones" because they support the mother's pouch ("marsupium" is Latin for "pouch"), but their presence on other groups of mammals indicates that this was not their original function, which some researchers think was to assist locomotion by supporting some of the muscles that flex the thigh.

Placentals are the only mammal lineage that lacks epipubic bones, and this absence has been considered to be correlated to the development of the placenta itself; epipubic bones stiffen the torso, preventing the expansion necessary for prolonged pregnancy. This however apparently did not prevent large litter sizes; Kayentatherium is now known to have given birth to litters of 38 undeveloped young, a considerably higher number than living monotremes or marsupials. However, vestiges of the epipubic bone may survive in a common placental characteristic, the baculum.

Additionally, the capacity for epipubic bones to prevent long term pregnancies has been debated in a 2022 study on multituberculates, which proved that they were capable of producing young as developed as those of placentals despite their epipubics.

== See also ==
- Evolution of mammals
- Obturator process
- Pelvic digit
- Proximodorsal process
