= Inferior ramus =

Inferior ramus may refer to:

- Inferior ramus of the ischium
- Inferior pubic ramus
