= Intercrural fibres of superficial inguinal ring =

Tendinous fibers of the lower abdomen

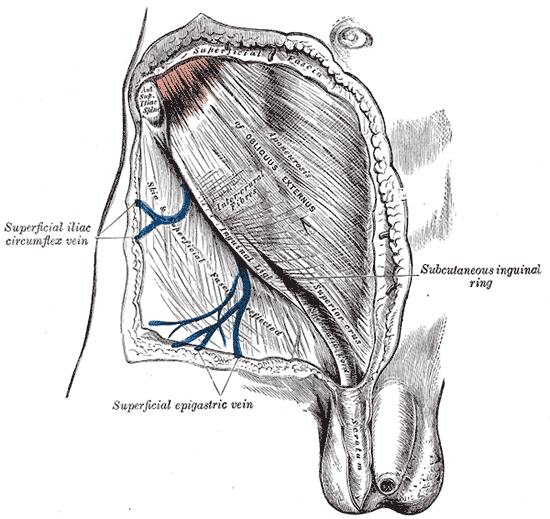
- The subcutaneous inguinal ring. (Intercrural fibers labeled at center.)

Details

Identifiers
- Latin: fibrae intercrurales anuli inguinalis superficialis
- TA98: A04.5.01.016
- TA2: 2372
- FMA: 77250

The intercrural fibers (intercolumnar fibers) are a series of curved tendinous fibers, which arch across the lower part of the aponeurosis of the Obliquus externus, describing curves with the convexities downward.

They have received their name from stretching across between the two crura of the subcutaneous inguinal ring, and they are much thicker and stronger at the inferior crus, where they are connected to the inguinal ligament, than superiorly, where they are inserted into the linea alba.

The intercrural fibers increase the strength of the lower part of the aponeurosis, and prevent the divergence of the crura from one another; they are more strongly developed in the male than in the female.

== Intercrural fascia ==
As they pass across the subcutaneous inguinal ring, they are connected together by delicate fibrous tissue, forming a fascia, called the intercrural fascia.

This intercrural fascia is continued down as a tubular prolongation around the spermatic cord and testis, and encloses them in a sheath; hence it is also called the external spermatic fascia.

The subcutaneous inguinal ring is seen as a distinct aperture only after the intercrural fascia has been removed.

== See also ==
- Superficial inguinal ring
