= Obturator foramen =

Opening in the pelvis

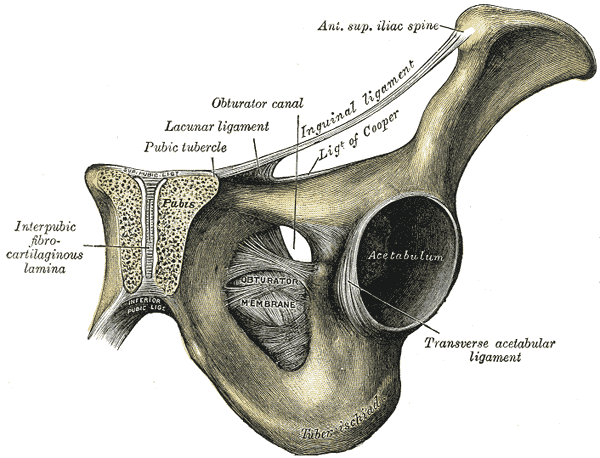
- Symphysis pubis exposed by a coronal section. Obturator canal labelled at center.

Details

Identifiers
- Latin: foramen obturatum
- TA98: A02.5.01.008
- TA2: 1314
- FMA: 16999

The obturator foramen is the large, bilaterally paired opening of the bony pelvis. It is formed by the pubis and ischium. It is mostly closed by the obturator membrane except for a small opening, the obturator canal, through which the obturator nerve and vessels pass.

== Structure ==
The obturator foramen is situated inferior and somewhat anterior to the acetabulum. It is bounded by the pubis bone and the ischium: superiorly by the (grooved obturator surface) of the superior ramus of pubis, inferiorly by the ramus of ischium, and laterally by (the anterior edge of) the body of ischium (including by the margin of the acetabulum).

The margin of the foramen is thin and uneven, and gives attachment to the obturator membrane. Superiorly, it presents a deep groove - the obturator groove - which passes obliquely inferomedially from the pelvis.

The foramen is largely closed by the obturator membrane save for a small opening at the superolateral end of the obturator foramen - the obturator canal - which establishes a communication between the pelvic cavity and the thigh. This canal gives passage to the obturator nerve, artery, and veins.

The free edge of the obturator membrane that bounds the obturator canal attaches at two tubercles (which may be indistinct):

- The anterior obturator tubercle - situated on the obturator crest at the anterior extremity of the inferior border of the superior ramus of pubis.
- The posterior obturator tubercle - situated at the anterior border of the acetabular notch (and thus on the medial border of the ischium).

=== Variation ===
In accordance with the overall sex dimorphism of the pelvis, the obturator foramina are oval in the male, and wider and rather triangular in the female.

Unilateral pelvic hypoplasia can cause differences in size between the obturator foramina. Rarely, the obturator foramen may be doubled on one side.

== See also ==
- Obturator internus muscle
- Obturator externus muscle

== Additional images ==
The two circles at the bottom are the obturator foramina.

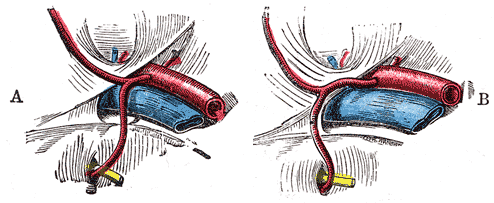
Variations in origin and course of obturator artery

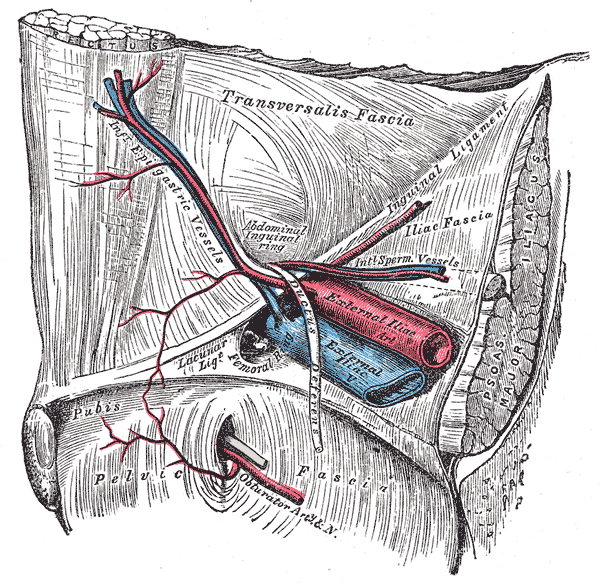
The relations of the femoral and abdominal inguinal rings, seen from within the abdomen. Right side.

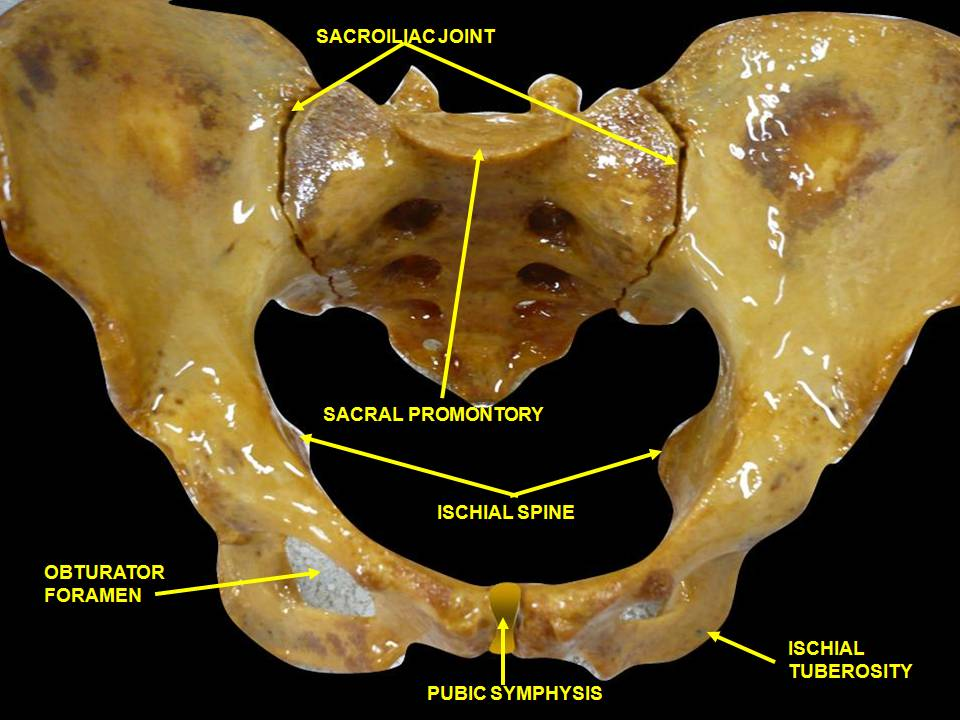
Anterior view of the body pelvis
