= Obturator externus groove =

The obturator externus groove is the groove on the posterior neck of the femur for the insertion of the obturator externus muscle, a muscle that is important during bipedal locomotion. It is located within the depression of the trochanteric fossa.

This landmark is used as evidence of bipedal locomotion in the hominins. The fossil Orrorin tugenensis (6-7 mya) possesses the obturator externus groove, which suggests that it moved bipedally and could represent one of the earliest fossils with evidence of bipedal locomotion.
