= External obturator muscle =

One of six small hip muscles in the lateral rotator group

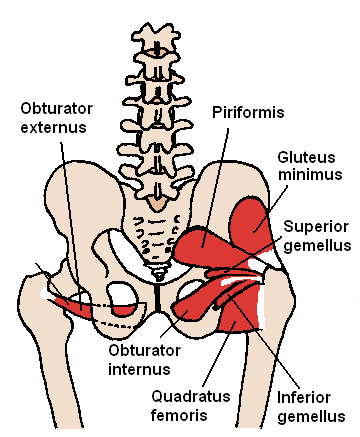
- The obturator externus and nearby hip muscles (posterior view)

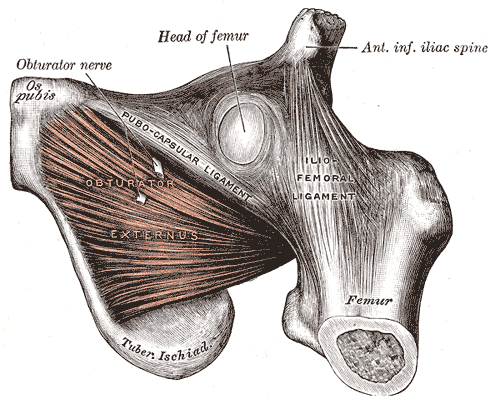
- The obturator externus. Anterior-Inferior view

Details
- Origin: Obturator foramen and obturator membrane
- Insertion: Trochanteric fossa of femur
- Artery: Obturator artery
- Nerve: Posterior branch of obturator nerve (third and fourth lumbar nerves)
- Actions: Abduct thigh, laterally rotates thigh

Identifiers
- Latin: musculus obturatorius externus
- TA98: A04.7.02.031
- TA2: 2636
- FMA: 22299

The external obturator muscle or obturator externus muscle (/ˌɒbtjʊəˈreɪtər ɪkˈstɜːrnəs/; OE) is a flat, triangular muscle, which covers the outer surface of the anterior wall of the pelvis.

It is sometimes considered part of the medial compartment of thigh, and sometimes considered part of the gluteal region.

It is also considered to be part of the short external rotators of the hip, along with the gemellus superior and inferior, piriformis, and quadratus femoris.

== Structure ==
It arises from the margin of bone immediately around the medial side of the obturator membrane and surrounding bone, viz., from the inferior pubic ramus, and the ramus of the ischium; it also arises from the medial two-thirds of the outer surface of the obturator membrane, and from the tendinous arch which completes the canal for the passage of the obturator vessels and nerves.

The fibers springing from the pubic arch extend on to the inner surface of the bone, where they obtain a narrow origin between the margin of the foramen and the attachment of the obturator membrane.

The fibers converge and pass posterolateral and upward, and end in a tendon which runs across the back of the neck of the femur and lower part of the capsule of the hip joint and is inserted into the trochanteric fossa of the femur.

=== Relations ===
The obturator vessels lie between the muscle and the obturator membrane; the anterior branch of the obturator nerve reaches the thigh by passing in front of the muscle, and the posterior branch by piercing it.

=== Variation ===
In 33% of people, a supernumerary muscle is found between the adductor brevis and minimus. While this muscle, when present, is similar to its neighbouring adductors, it is formed by separation from the superficial layer of the external obturator, and is thus not ontogenetically related to the adductor muscles of the hip. This muscle originates from the upper part of the inferior pubic ramus from where it runs downwards and laterally. In half of cases, it inserts into the anterior surface of the insertion aponeurosis of the adductor minimus. In the remaining cases, it is either inserted into the upper part of the pectineal line or the posterior part of the lesser trochanter.

It has been demonstrated by the course of the posterior branch of obturator nerve that the obturator externus is divided into a superior muscle fascicle and a main belly. The supernumerary muscle described above originates from the superior fascicle, while an anomalous fascicle — also derived from the external obturator — originates from the main belly. The "original" external obturator, i.e. without these supernumerary muscular parts, actually occurs in only 20% of cases, and apparently the external obturator readily undergoes ontogenetic variations.

== Function ==
The external obturator muscle acts as a lateral rotator of the hip joint. As a short muscle around the hip joint, it stabilizes the hip joint as a postural muscle. It also helps to abduct the hip joint when in flexion. And it helps to stabilise the head of the femur in the socket during flexion and internal rotation as its posterior fibers reinforce the posterior capsule of hip joint.

== Additional images ==
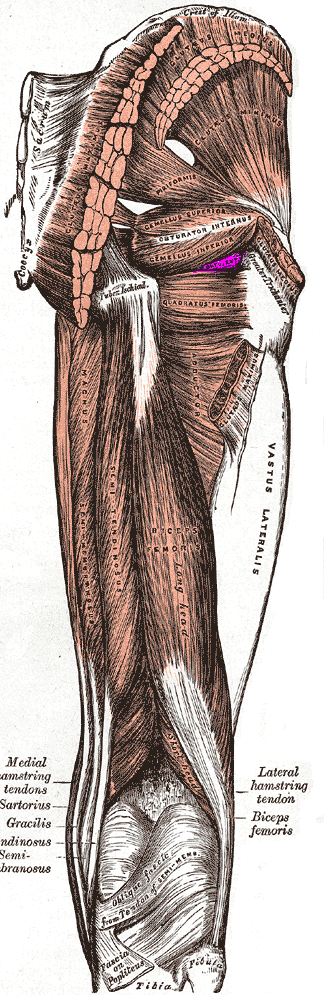
Muscles of the back of thigh, with insertion of obturator externus muscle labeled in purple

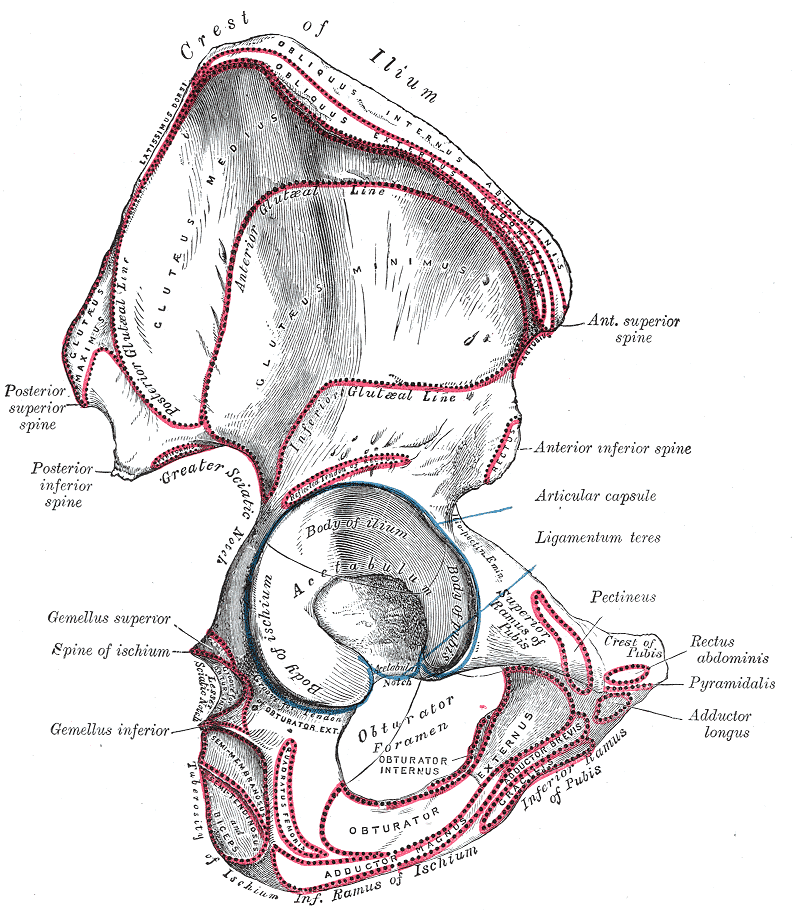
Right hip bone. External surface

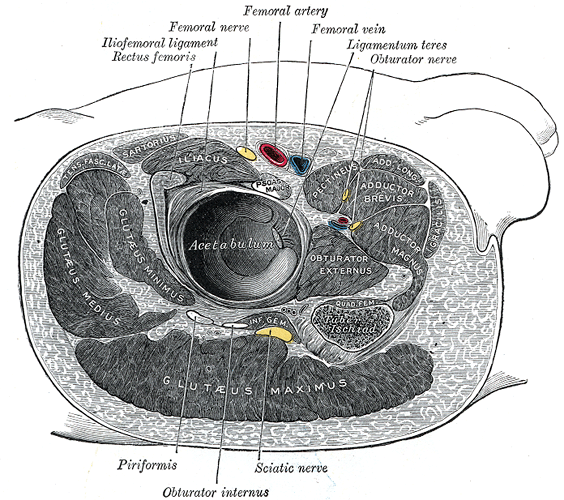
Structures surrounding right hip-joint (viewed from below)

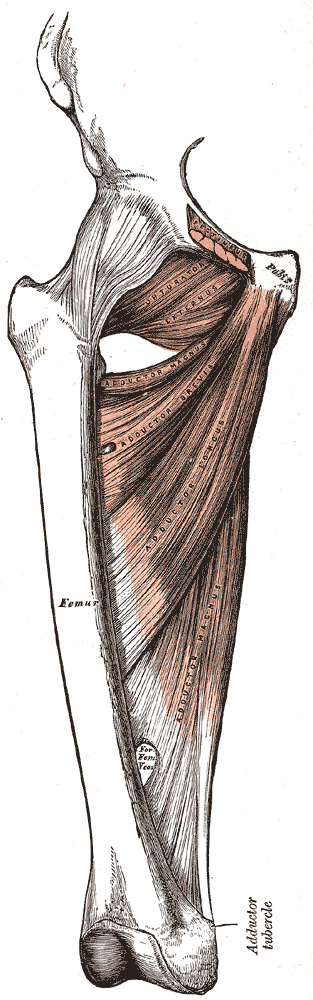
Deep muscles of the medial femoral region

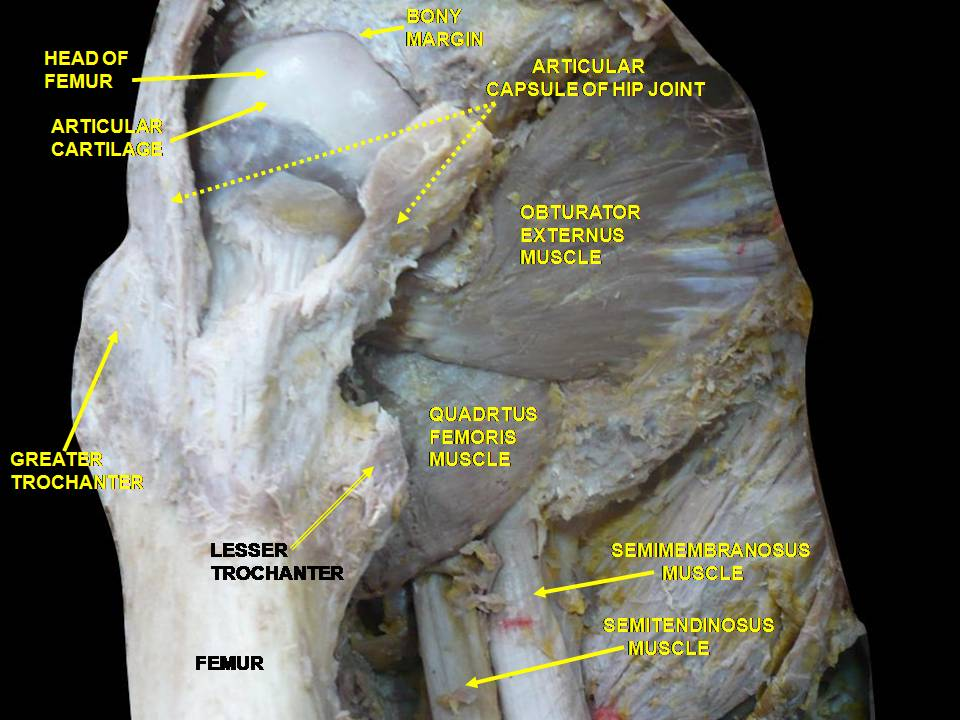
Obturator externus muscle. Deep dissection. Anterior view.

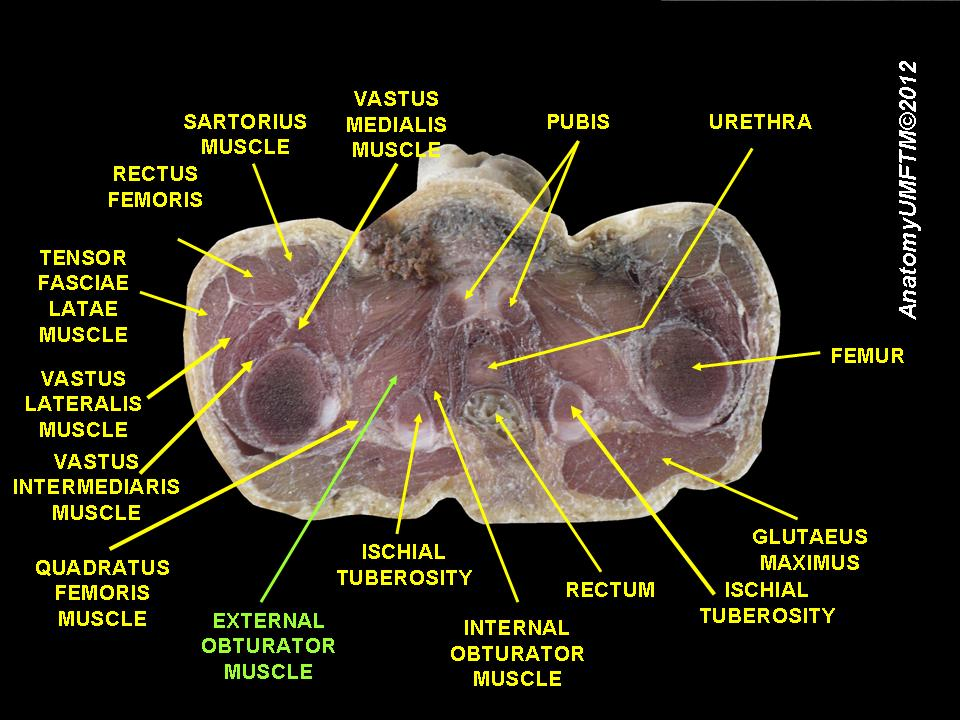
Obturator externus muscle

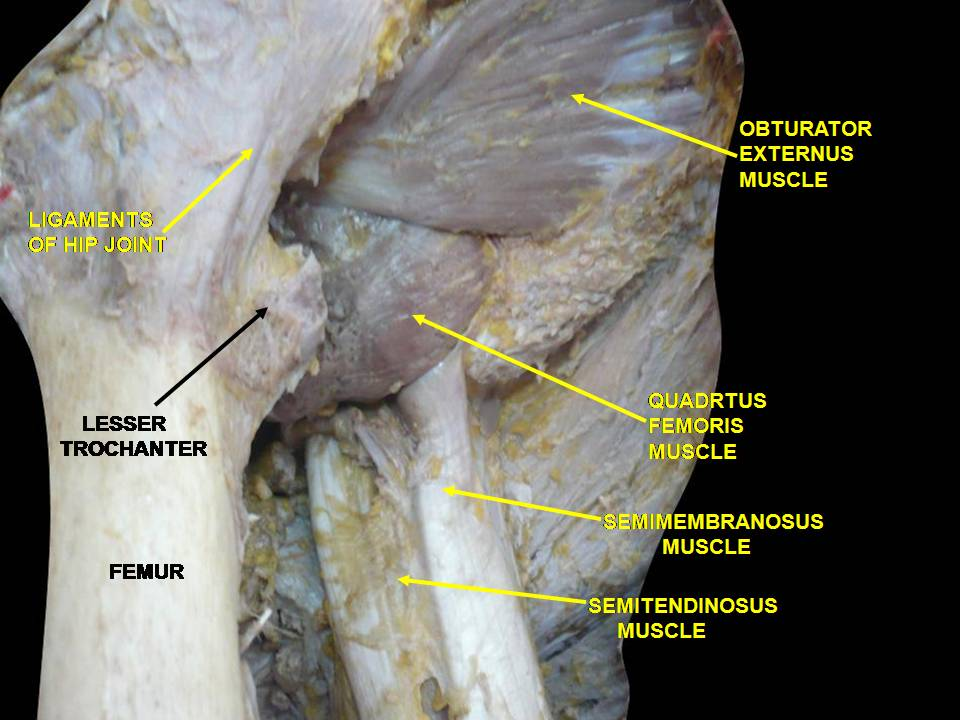
Muscles of thigh. Anterior views.

== See also ==
- Obturator externus groove
