= Crura of superficial inguinal ring =

Ligamentous tissue in the lower abdomen

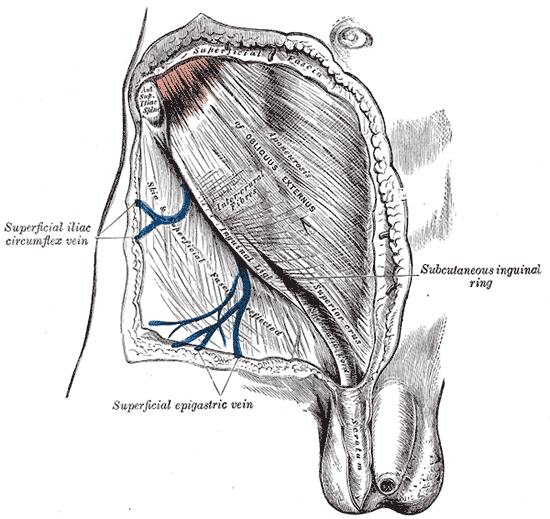
- The subcutaneous inguinal ring. (Superior crus labeled at bottom right.)

Details

Identifiers
- Latin: crus mediale anuli inguinalis superficialis, crus laterale anuli inguinalis superficialis

The superficial inguinal ring is bounded below by the crest of the pubis; on either side by the margins of the opening in the aponeurosis, which are called the crura of the ring; and above, by a series of curved intercrural fibers.

- The inferior crus (or lateral, or external pillar) is the stronger and is formed by that portion of the inguinal ligament which is inserted into the pubic tubercle; it is curved so as to form a kind of groove, upon which, in the male, the spermatic cord rests.
- The superior crus (or medial, or internal pillar) is a broad, thin, flat band, attached to the front of the pubic symphysis and interlacing with its fellow of the opposite side.

== See also ==
- Wiktionary: crus
