= Ligament of head of femur =

Ligament of the hip joint

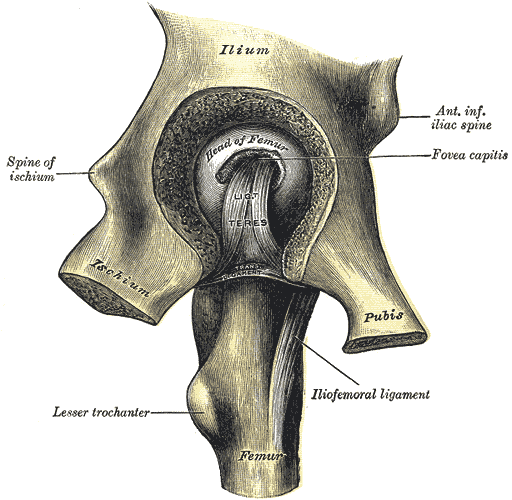
- Left hip-joint, opened by removing the floor of the acetabulum from within the pelvis (Ligament of head of femur labeled as ligt. teres at cente.)

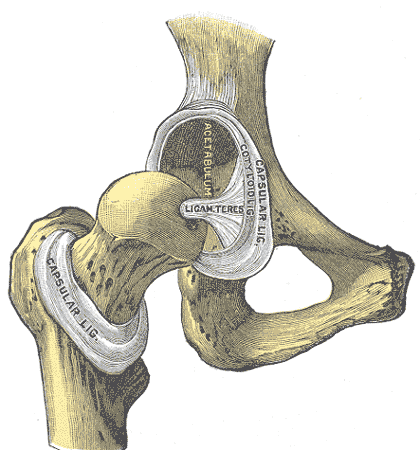
- Hip-joint, front view. The capsular ligament has been largely removed (ligament visible at center labeled as ligam teres)

Details
- From: Femur head
- To: Acetabular notch

Identifiers
- Latin: ligamentum capitis femoris, ligamentum teres femoris
- MeSH: D000069593
- TA98: A03.6.07.010
- TA2: 1882
- FMA: 43235

The ligament of the head of the femur (round ligament of the femur, or foveal ligament) is a weak ligament located in the hip joint. It is triangular in shape and somewhat flattened. The ligament is implanted by its apex into the anterosuperior part of the fovea capitis femoris and its base is attached by two bands, one into either side of the acetabular notch, and between these bony attachments it blends with the transverse ligament.

== Anatomy ==
=== Development ===
Initially, the ligament contains a small artery (the acetabular branch of the obturator artery) which becomes obliterated in late childhood.

=== Variation ===
It is ensheathed by the synovial membrane, and varies greatly in strength in different subjects; occasionally only the synovial fold exists, and in rare cases even this is absent.

== Function ==
The ligament becomes taut when the thigh is both flexed and either adducted or laterally/externally rotated. The ligament is usually too weak to actually function as a ligament past childhood; excessive movement at the hip joint is instead primarily limited by the three capsular ligament of the hip joint. Nevertheless, more recent research suggests the ligament may have a number of functions, including a significant biomechanical role on the basis of cadaveric studies where increases of range of motion were seen after sectioning of the ligament.

== Other animals ==
It has been suggested that some animals, such as the orangutan and Indian elephant, lack a ligamentum teres. However, the presence of a ligamentum teres, albeit with a morphology different from the human version, has been found upon dissection in both these animals. In the orangutan, it is believed to play a significant role in preventing dislocation of the femoral head within extreme ranges of motion. In the Indian elephant, it is the primary support of the hip joint when the hind limbs are abducted.

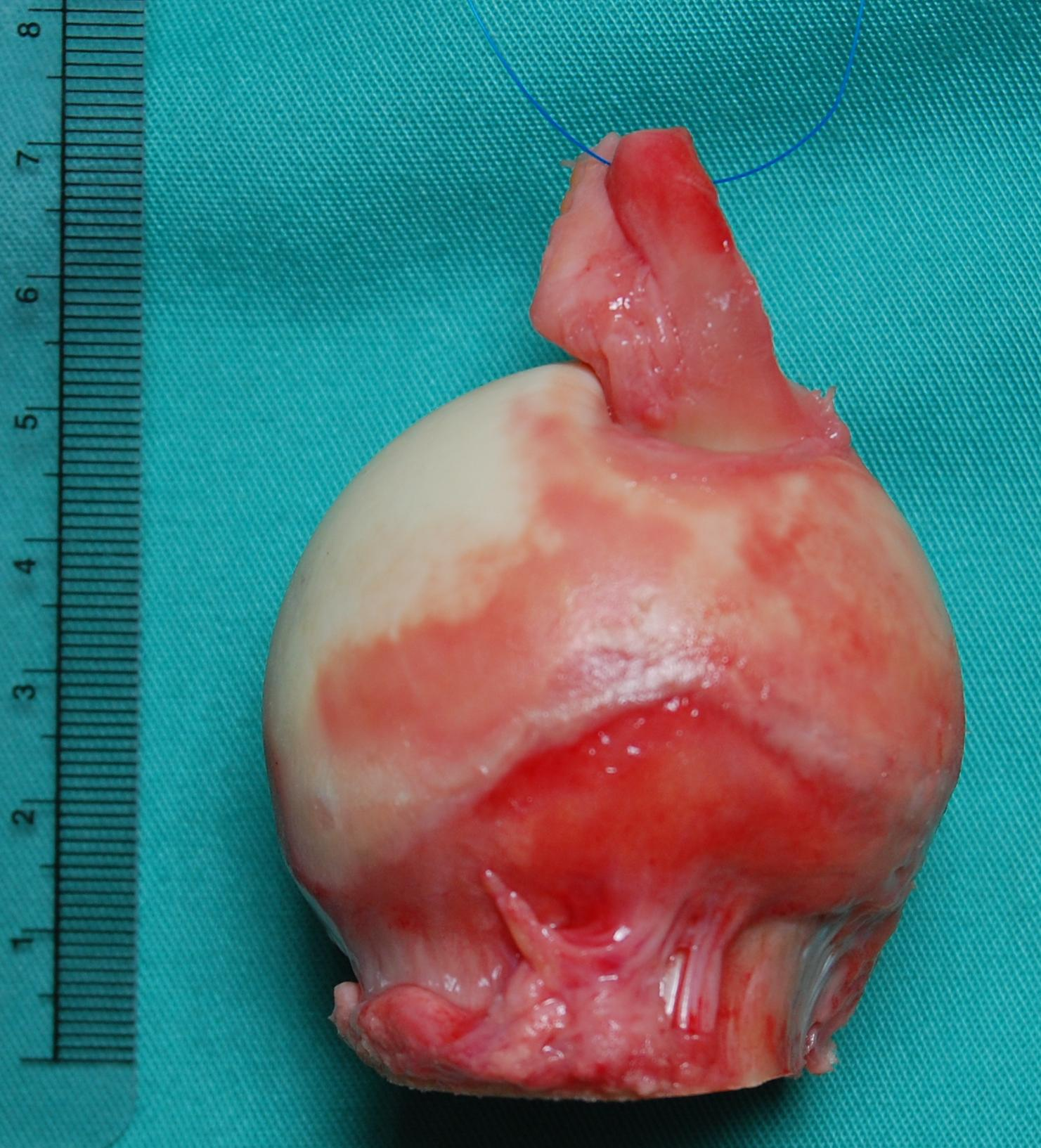
A human femur head with some synovium attached at the bottom and the ligament of the head of the femur attached at the top. A blue suture wire is drawn through the ligament. Ruler in centimetres at left side.

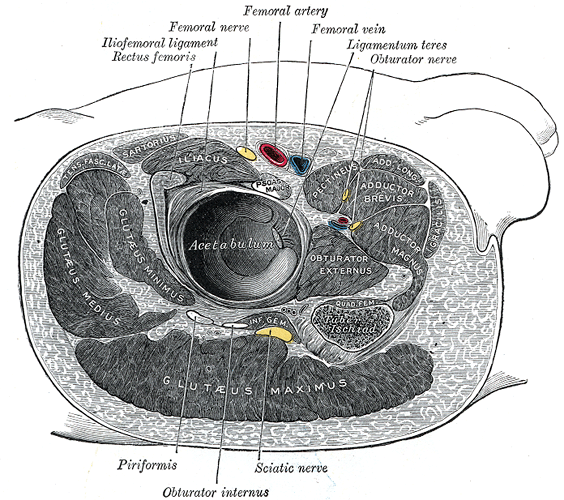
Structures surrounding right hip-joint

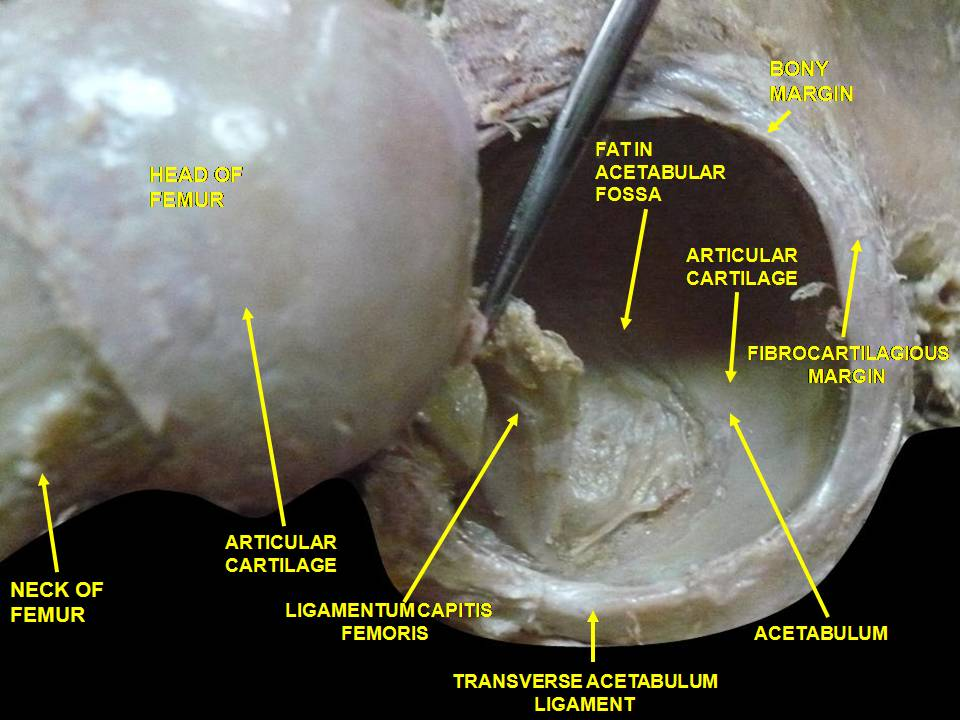
Hip joint. Lateral view. Ligament of head of femur
