= Obturator muscles =

Obturator muscles may refer to:

- External obturator muscle
- Internal obturator muscle
