= Obturator veins =

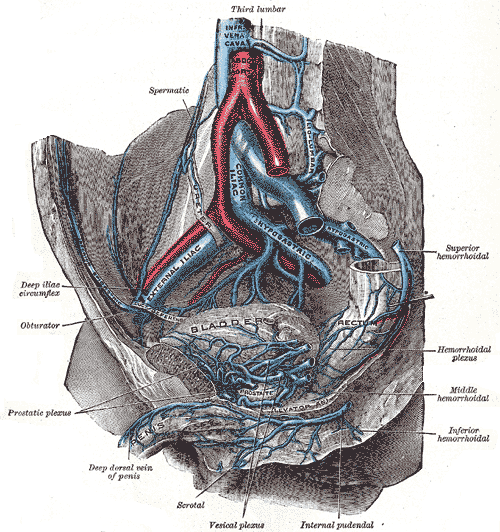
- The veins of the right half of the male pelvis. (Obturator labeled at center left.)

Details
- Drains to: Internal iliac vein
- Artery: Obturator artery

Identifiers
- Latin: venae obturatoriae
- TA98: A12.3.10.007
- TA2: 5027
- FMA: 70909

The obturator vein begins in the upper portion of the adductor region of the thigh and enters the pelvis through the upper part of the obturator foramen, in the obturator canal.

It runs backward and upward on the lateral wall of the pelvis below the obturator artery, and then passes between the ureter and the internal iliac artery, to end in the internal iliac vein.

It has an anterior and posterior branch (similar to obturator artery), which are larger than its corresponding arteries.

The obturator veins have valves, especially in the extrapelvic section.

== Additional images ==
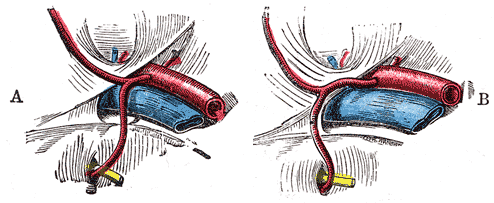
Variations in origin and course of obturator artery.

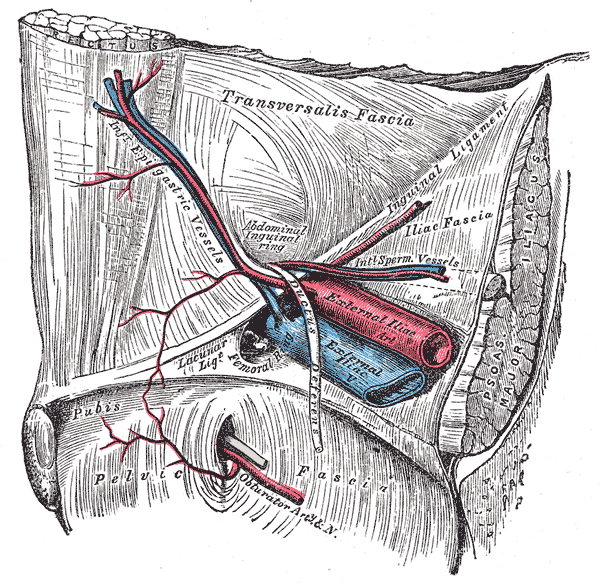
The relations of the femoral and abdominal inguinal rings, seen from within the abdomen. Right side.

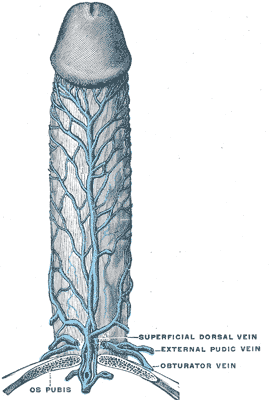
Veins of the penis.
