= Obturator canal =

Passageway connecting the pelvis to the thigh

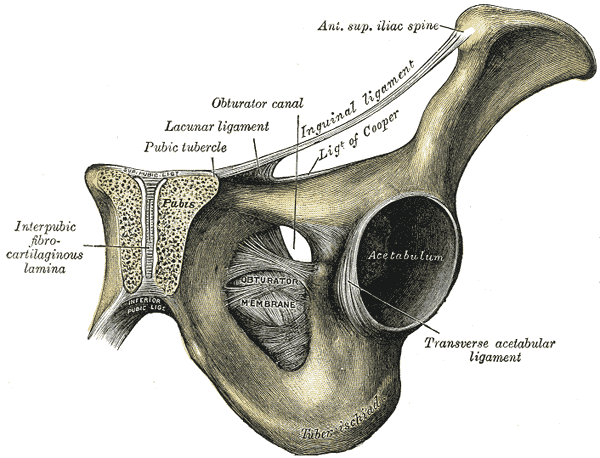
- Obturator canal, above the obturator membrane

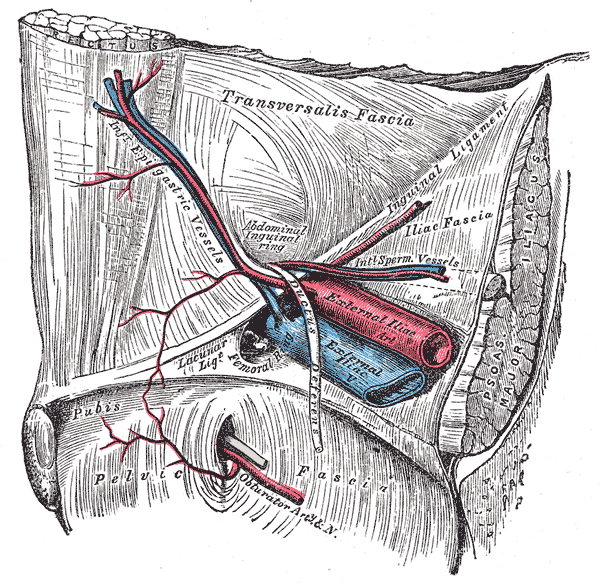
- The relations of the femoral and abdominal inguinal rings, seen from within the abdomen. Right side. (Obturator canal not labeled, but visible at bottom center.)

Details

Identifiers
- Latin: canalis obturatorius
- TA98: A03.6.01.003
- TA2: 1849
- FMA: 25715

The obturator canal is a passageway formed in the obturator foramen by part of the obturator membrane and the pelvis. It connects the pelvis to the thigh.

== Structure ==
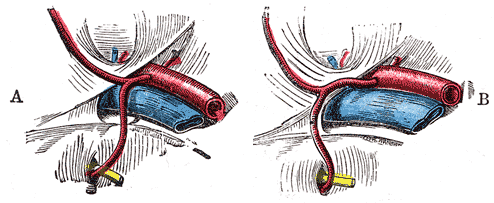
Variations in origin and course of obturator artery. (Obturator canal not labeled, but visible at bottom center of each diagram.)

The obturator canal is formed between the obturator membrane and the pelvis. The obturator artery, obturator vein, and obturator nerve all travel through the canal.

== Clinical significance ==
An obturator hernia is a type of hernia involving an intrusion into the obturator canal.

The obturator nerve can be compressed in the obturator canal.

The obturator canal may be compressed during pregnancy and major traumatic injuries, causing obturator syndrome.

== See also ==
- Obturator fascia
