= Acetabular notch =

Deep notch in the acetabulum of the hip bone

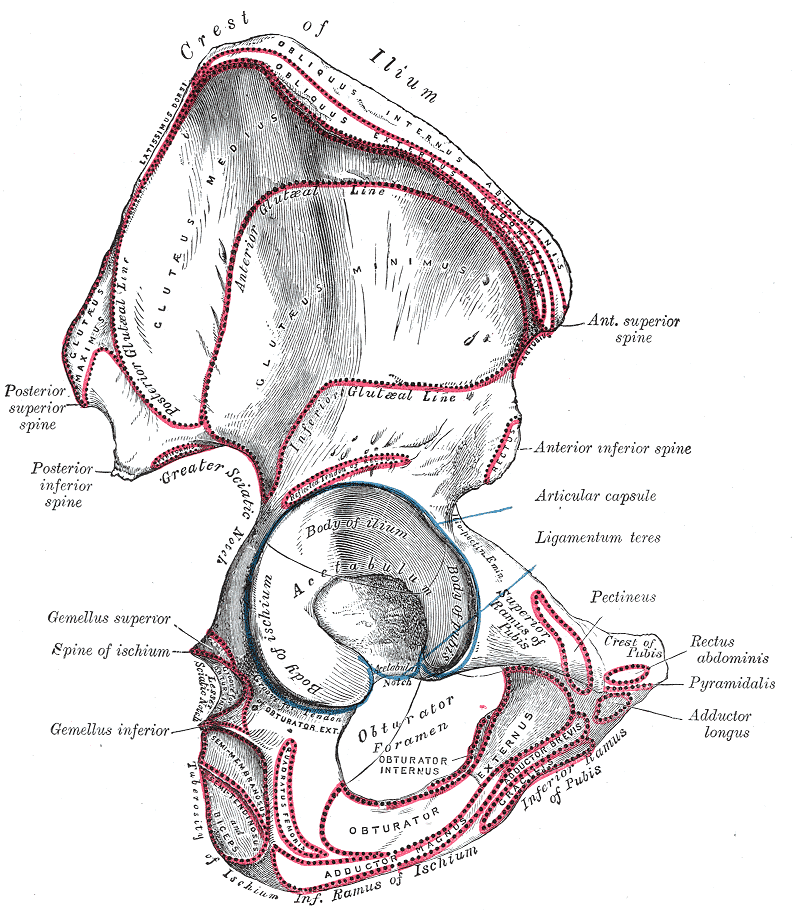
- Right hip bone. External surface (acetabular notch visible near center, inside blue line).

Details

Identifiers
- Latin: incisura acetabuli
- TA98: A02.5.01.005
- TA2: 1311
- FMA: 16944

The acetabular notch is a deep notch in the inferior portion of the rim of the acetabulum. It is bridged by the transverse acetabular ligament, converting it into a foramen (through which nerves and vessels (including the acetabular notch of obturator artery) pass into the hip joint cavity). It is continuous with space of the acetabular fossa. The lunate surface of acetabulum is discontinued opposite the notch.

The ligament of the head of the femur attaches at the margins of the notch. The anterior margin of the acetabular notch presents a posterior obturator tubercle onto which the obturator membrane attaches.
