= Obturator process =

The obturator process is an anatomical feature on the pelvis of archosaurs.

It is a raised area of the ischium bone of the pelvis. It is the origin of muscles that attach to the femur and aid in running. These muscles are called M. pubo-ischio-femoralis externus 1 and 2 in crocodylians. In birds the muscles are called the M. obturatorius lateralis and M. obturatorius medialis. They insert on the greater trochanter of the femur. See proximodorsal process
