= Obturator membrane =

Membrane in the hip

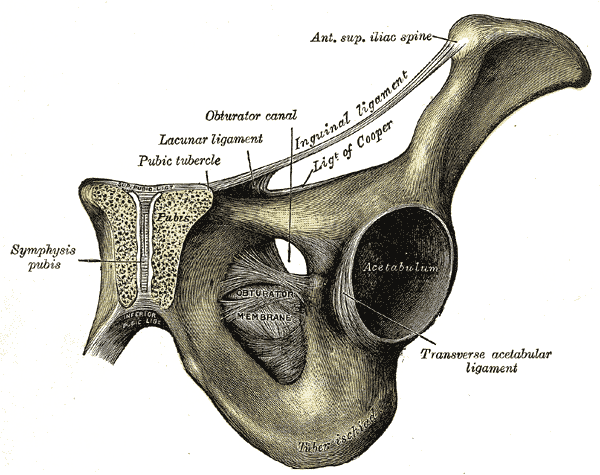
- Anterior cut-out view of right pelvis, obturator membrane labeled at center.

Details

Identifiers
- Latin: membrana obturatoria
- TA98: A03.6.01.002
- TA2: 1848
- FMA: 25709

The obturator membrane is a thin fibrous sheet, which almost completely closes the obturator foramen.

Its fibers are arranged in interlacing bundles mainly transverse in direction; the uppermost bundle is attached to the obturator tubercles and completes the obturator canal for the passage of the obturator vessels and nerve.

The membrane is attached to the sharp margin of the obturator foramen except at its lower lateral angle, where it is fixed to the pelvic surface of the inferior ramus of the ischium, i. e., within the margin.

Both obturator muscles are connected with this membrane.

== Additional images ==
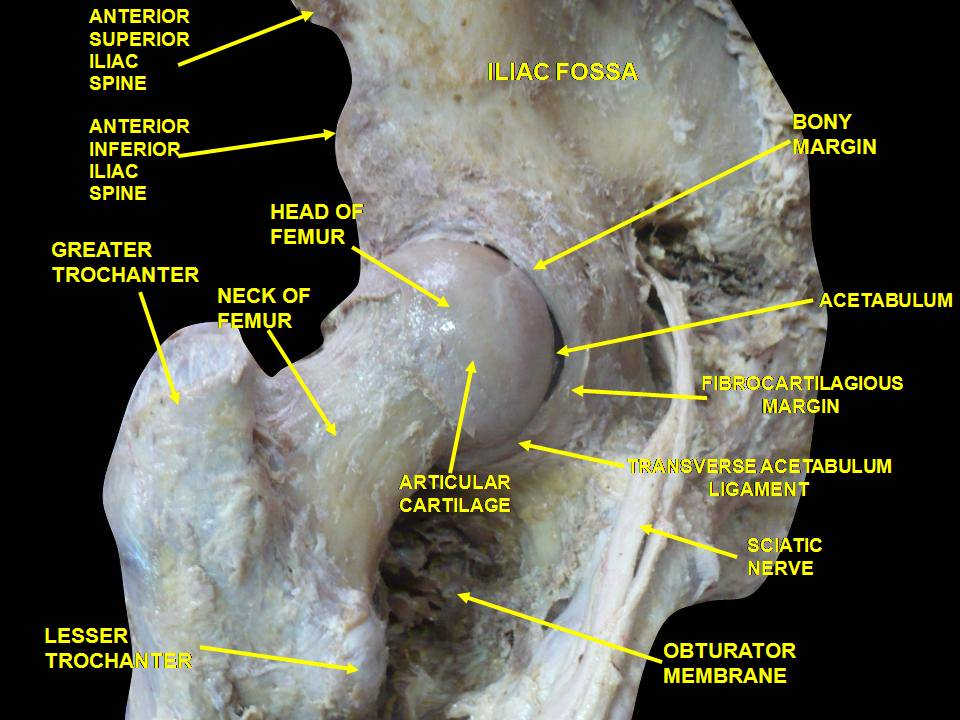
Hip joint. Lateral view. Obturator membrane
