= Groin =

Area between the torso and the thigh

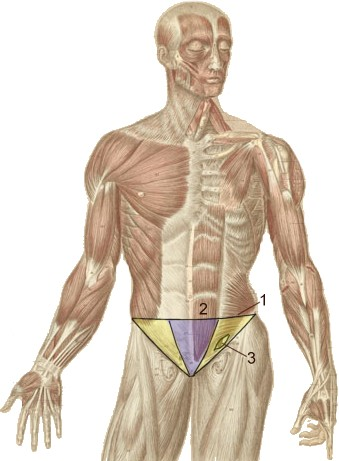
Anatomy plate from "Handbuch der Anatomie des Menschen", published 1841 in Leipzig, Germany. (Modified to illustrate inguinal (yellow) and pubic region (bluish). 1 Planum interspinale, 2 rectus abdominis muscle, 3 inguinal canal)

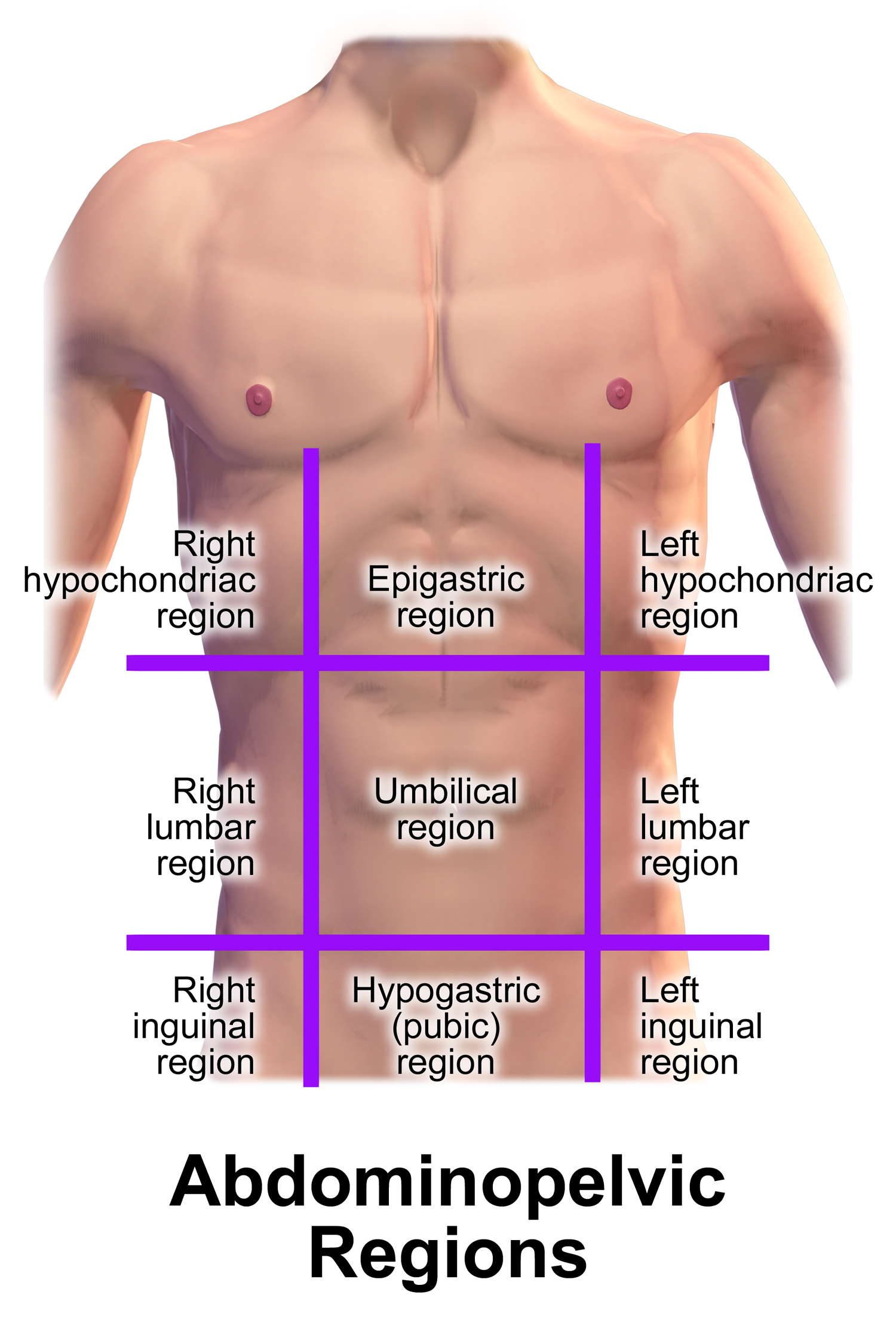
Left and right inguinal regions shown in lower part of diagram

In human anatomy, the groin, also known as the inguinal region or iliac region, is the junctional area between the torso and the thigh. The groin is at the front of the body on either side of the pubic tubercle, where the lower part of the abdominal wall meets the thigh. A fold or crease is formed at this junction known as the inguinal groove or crease. This is also the area of the medial compartment of the thigh that contains attachments of the adductor muscles of the hip or the groin muscles. A "groin pull" involving a strain of the leg adductor muscle group in the inguinal area is a common sports injury.

== Gross anatomy ==
Where the lower part of the anterior abdominal wall meets the thigh, a crease is formed known as the inguinal groove or crease. The junction is the area of the medial compartment of the thigh that contains the attachments of the adductor muscles of the hip, also known as the groin muscles.

The adductor muscles that make up the groin consist of the adductor brevis, adductor longus, adductor magnus, gracilis, and pectineus. These groin muscles adduct the thigh (bring the thigh and knee closer to the midline).

The groin is innervated by branches of the lumbar plexus. The pectineus muscle is innervated by the femoral nerve, and the hamstring portion of adductor magnus is innervated by the tibial nerve.

In the groin, underneath the skin, there are three to five deep inguinal lymph nodes that play a role in the immune system. A chain of superficial inguinal lymph nodes drain to the deep nodes.

There are two depressions called fossae in an area called the inguinal triangle—the lateral inguinal fossa and the medial inguinal fossa.

The inguinal ligament runs from the pubic tubercle to the anterior superior iliac spine, and its anatomy is important for hernia operations.

== Clinical significance ==
A pulled groin muscle usually refers to a painful strain of the hip adductor muscles. This type of injury is related to risk factors including overuse and previous injury.

An inguinal hernia is a hernia of the groin and can be either a direct hernia, or an indirect hernia, according to its particular location. Sometimes a direct hernia may be present with an indirect hernia on the same side when it is known as a saddlebag hernia.

Like other flexion surfaces of large joints (popliteal fossa, armpit, cubital fossa), it is an area where blood vessels and nerves pass relatively superficially, and with an increased amount of lymph nodes.

In a venography procedure, the groin is the preferred site for incisions to enter a catheter into the vascular system.

== See also ==
- Athletic pubalgia
- Loin—Space between the ribs and pelvis
