= List of adductors of the human body =

Adduction is an anatomical term of motion referring to a movement which brings a part of the anatomy closer to the middle sagittal plane of the body.

== Upper limb ==
=== Arm and shoulder ===
- of arm at shoulder (lowering arm)
  - Subscapularis
  - Teres major
  - Pectoralis major
  - Triceps brachii (long head)
  - Latissimus dorsi
  - Coracobrachialis

=== Hand and wrist ===
- of hand at wrist
  - Flexor carpi ulnaris
  - Extensor carpi ulnaris
- of fingers
  - Palmar interossei
- of thumb
  - Adductor pollicis

== Lower limb ==
- of thigh at hip
  - medial compartment of thigh/adductor muscles of the hip
    - Adductor longus
    - Adductor brevis
    - Adductor magnus
    - Pectineus
    - Gracilis

=== Foot and toes ===
- of toes (S2-S3)
  - Adductor hallucis
  - Plantar interossei

== Other ==
- eyeball
  - Superior rectus muscle
  - Inferior rectus muscle
  - Medial rectus muscle
- jaw (muscles of mastication, the closing of the jaw is adduction):
  - masseter
  - pterygoid muscles (lateral and medial)
  - temporalis
- vocal folds
  - Lateral cricoarytenoid muscle
