= Adductores =

Adductores may refer to:

- Adductor brevis muscle
- Adductor longus muscle
- Adductor magnus muscle
