= List of flexors of the human body =

In anatomy, flexor is a muscle that contracts to perform flexion (from the Latin verb flectere, to bend), a movement that decreases the angle between the bones converging at a joint. For example, one's elbow joint flexes when one brings their hand closer to the shoulder, thus decreasing the angle between the upper arm and the forearm.

== Flexors ==
=== Upper limb ===
- of the humerus bone (the bone in the upper arm) at the shoulder
  - Pectoralis major
  - Anterior deltoid
  - Coracobrachialis
  - Biceps brachii
- of the forearm at the elbow
  - Brachialis
  - Brachioradialis
  - Biceps brachii
- of carpus (the carpal bones) at the wrist
  - flexor carpi radialis
  - flexor carpi ulnaris
  - palmaris longus
- of the hand
  - flexor pollicis longus muscle
  - flexor pollicis brevis muscle
  - flexor digitorum profundus muscle
  - flexor digitorum superficialis muscle

=== Lower limb ===
==== Hip ====
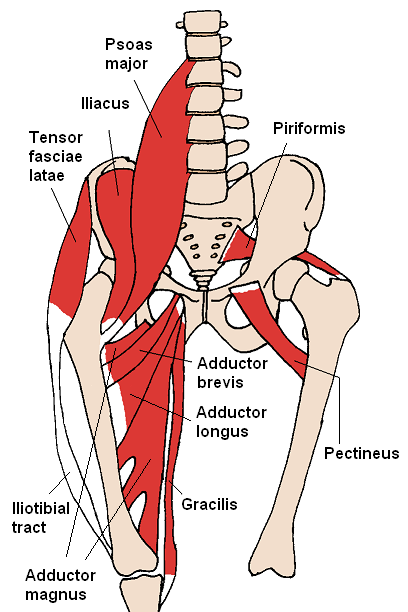
The iliacus and nearby muscles

The hip flexors are (in descending order of importance to the action of flexing the hip joint):

- Collectively known as the iliopsoas or inner hip muscles:
  - Psoas major
  - Iliacus muscle
- Anterior compartment of thigh
  - Rectus femoris (part of the quadriceps muscle group)
  - Sartorius
- One of the gluteal muscles:
  - Tensor fasciae latae
- Medial compartment of thigh
  - Pectineus
  - Adductor longus
  - Adductor brevis
  - Gracilis

Without the iliopsoas muscles, flexion in sitting position is not possible across the horizontal plane.

==== Thigh ====
- of thigh at knee (L5-S2)
  - Biceps femoris
  - Semitendinosus
  - Semimembranosus
  - Gracilis
  - Sartorius
  - Gastrocnemius
  - Popliteus
  - Plantaris (negligible)
- of toes
  - Posterior compartment of leg
    - Flexor hallucis longus
    - Flexor digitorum longus
  - Flexor digitorum brevis
  - Quadratus plantae
  - Flexor hallucis brevis
  - Flexor digiti minimi brevis
- of proximal phalanges at metatarsophalangeal joint
  - Lumbrical muscle (foot)
  - Plantar interossei
  - Dorsal interossei

=== Other ===
- torso/lumbar vertebrae
  - Rectus abdominis muscle
- neck at atlanto-occipital joint
  - Longus capitis muscle
  - Longus colli muscle

== See also ==
- List of extensors of the human body
