= Adductor muscles of the hip =

Group of muscles

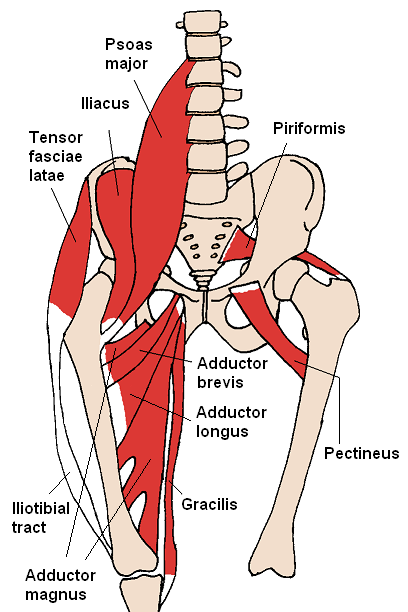
- The adductors and nearby muscles

Details
- Origin: Pubis
- Insertion: Femur and tibia
- Nerve: Obturator nerve
- Actions: Adduction of hip

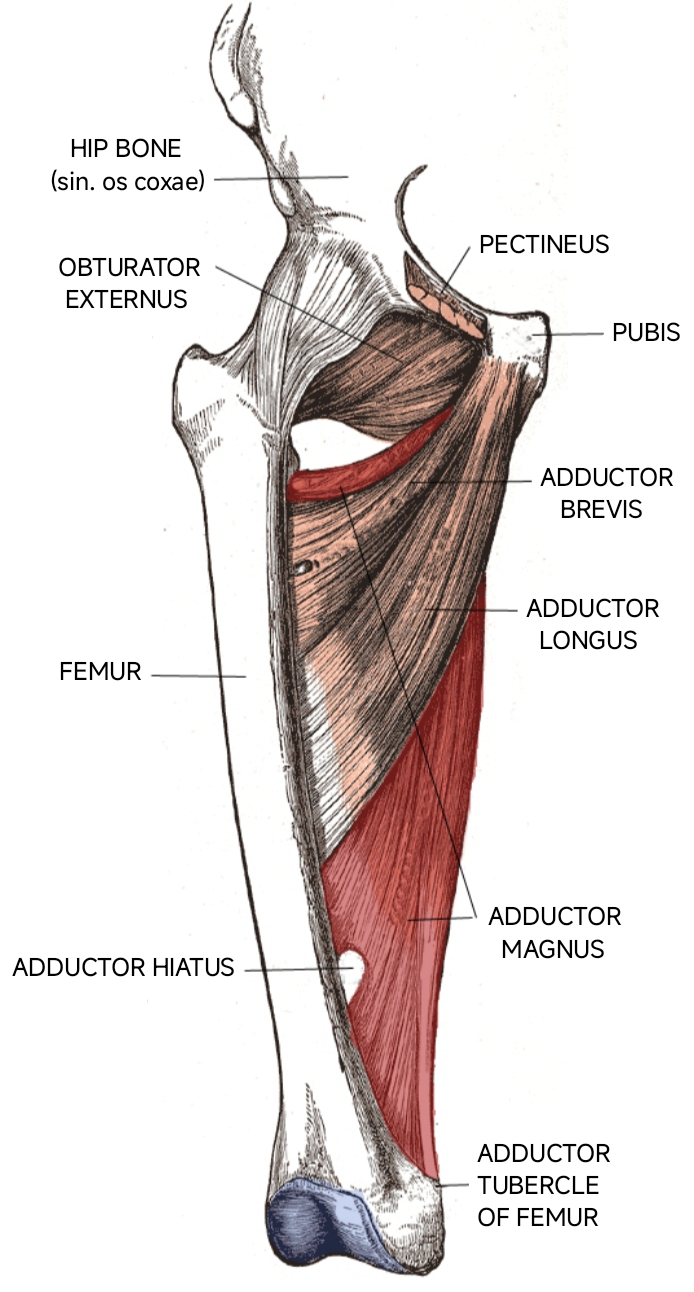
Deep muscles of the medial femoral region; right side, anterior view. (After Gray.)

The adductor muscles of the hip are a group of muscles in the medial compartment of the thigh mostly used for bringing the thighs together (called adduction).

== Structure ==
The adductor group is made up of:

- Adductor brevis
- Adductor longus
- Adductor magnus
- Adductor minimus This is widely considered to be a part of adductor magnus.
- pectineus
- gracilis
- Obturator externus is also part of the medial compartment of thigh

The adductors originate on the pubis and ischium bones and insert mainly on the medial posterior surface of the femur.

Muscle	Origin	Insertion	innervation
Adductor brevis	Inferior pubic ramus	Medial ridge of linea aspera	Obturator nerve (L2-L4)
Adductor longus	Front side of the pubic bone under the pubic tubercle	Medial ridge of linea aspera	Obturator nerve (L2-L4)
Adductor magnus	Inferior pubic ramus and ischial tuberosity	Medial ridge of linea aspera and the adductor tubercle	Obturator nerve and tibial nerve (L2-L5)
Adductor minimus	Inferior pubic ramus	Medial ridge of linea aspera	Obturator nerve (L2)
Pectineus	Pectineal line (pubis)	Pectineal line	Femoral nerve and sometimes the obturator nerve (L2-L4)
Gracilis	Inferior pubic ramus	Pes anserinus on the tibia	Obturator nerve (L2-L3)
Obturator externus	Lateral surface of obturator membrane and the ischiopubic ramus	Trochanteric fossa	Posterior branch of obturator nerve (L5-S2)

=== Nerve supply ===
The pectineus is the only adductor muscle that is innervated by the femoral nerve. The other adductor muscles are innervated by the obturator nerve with the exception of a small part of the adductor magnus which is innervated by the tibial nerve.

=== Variation ===
In 33% of people a supernumerary muscle is found between the adductor brevis and adductor minimus. When present, this muscle originates from the upper part of the inferior ramus of the pubis from where it runs downwards and laterally. In half of cases, it inserts into the anterior surface of the insertion aponeurosis of the adductor minimus. In the remaining cases, it is either inserted into the upper part of the pectineal line or the posterior part of the lesser trochanter. While similar to its neighbouring adductors, it is formed by separation from the superficial layer of the obturator externus, and is thus not ontogenetically related to the adductors.

== Clinical significance ==
=== Tenotomy ===
An adductor tenotomy (cutting the origin tendons of the adductor muscles of the thigh) and obturator neurectomy (cutting the anterior branch of the obturator nerve) are sometimes performed on children with cerebral palsy. These children often have hypertonia of the adductor muscles, making abduction difficult, obstructing normal hip development, and putting them at risk of hip luxation.
