= Composite muscle =

Muscles which have more than one set of fibers

Composite or hybrid muscles are those muscles which have more than one set of fibers but perform the same function and are usually supplied by different nerves for different set of fibers.

== Examples ==
- Brachialis: Musculocutaneous nerve is motor and radial nerve is proprioceptive.
- Adductor magnus : Its adductor part by posterior division of obturator nerve and hamstring part by tibial part of sciatic nerve.
- Biceps femoris: Its long head is supplied by the tibial part of sciatic nerve, whereas the short head is supplied by the common peroneal nerve. This reflects the composite derivation from the flexor and extensor musculature.
- Pectineus: Its anterior set of fibers are supplied by the femoral nerve, whereas posterior set of fibers are supplied by the obturator nerve.
- Flexor digitorum profundus: Its radial half of is supplied by the median nerve and the ulnar half is supplied by the ulnar nerve.
- Flexor pollicis brevis: Supplied by recurrent branch of the median nerve and the deep branch of the ulnar nerve
- Iliopsoas: Supplied by spinal nerves and femoral nerve
- The tongue is a composite muscle made up of various components like longitudinal, transverse, horizontal muscles with different parts innervated having different nerve supply.
- Digastric muscle: Its anterior belly is supplied by mylohyoid nerve (a branch of trigeminal nerve). The posterior belly is supplied by the facial nerve.
- Pectoralis major: supplied by medial and lateral pectoral nerves.

== Commonly confused ==
Certain muscles are commonly confused with composite muscles which they are not. Examples are:

- Rectus femoris
- Omohyoid
- Occipitofrontalis
- Ligament of Trietz
