= Posterior branch of obturator nerve =

Details
- From: Obturator nerve
- Innervates: Adductor magnus muscle

Identifiers
- Latin: ramus posterior nervi obturatorii
- TA98: A14.2.07.016
- TA2: 6536
- FMA: 45307

The posterior branch of the obturator nerve is a mixed nerve of a lower limb. It is a terminal branch that arises from the division of the obturator nerve between the pectineus muscle anteriorly and the external obturator muscle posteriorly.

It pierces the anterior part of the obturator externus, and supplies this muscle; it then passes behind the adductor brevis on the front of the adductor magnus, where it divides into numerous muscular branches which are distributed to the adductor magnus and the adductor brevis.

It usually gives off an articular branch to the knee-joint.

== Articular branch for the knee-joint ==
The articular branch for the knee-joint is sometimes absent; it either perforates the lower part of the adductor magnus, or passes through the opening which transmits the femoral artery, and enters the popliteal fossa; it then descends upon the popliteal artery, as far as the back part of the knee-joint, where it perforates the oblique popliteal ligament, and is distributed to the synovial membrane. It gives filaments to the popliteal artery.
