= Accessory obturator nerve =

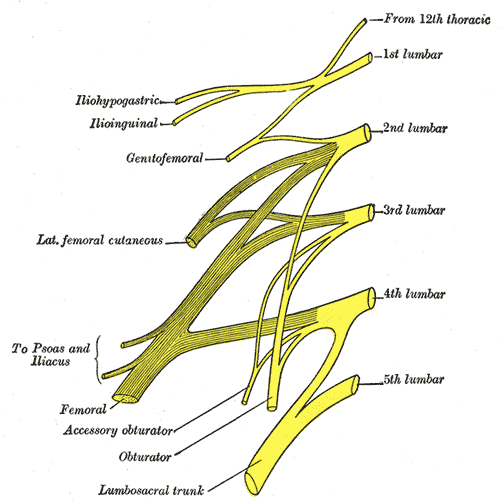
- Plan of lumbar plexus (accessory obturator visible at bottom left).

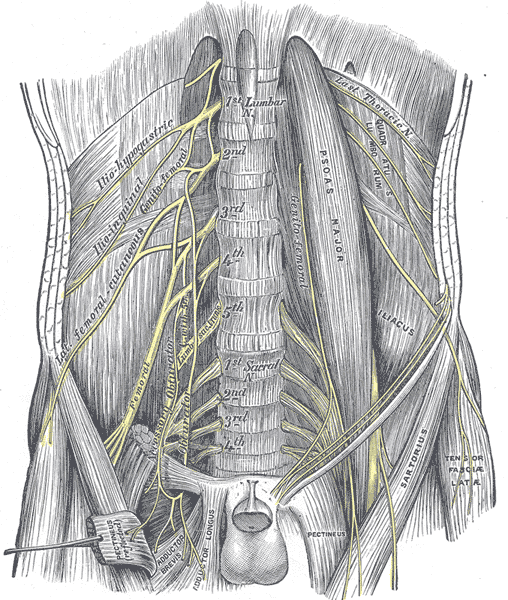
- The lumbar plexus and its branches (accessory obturator visible at bottom left).

Details

Identifiers
- Latin: nervus obturatorius accessorius
- TA98: A14.2.07.019
- TA2: 6538
- FMA: 16488

In human anatomy, the accessory obturator nerve is an accessory nerve in the lumbar region present in about 29% of cases.

It is of small size, and arises from the ventral divisions of the third and fourth lumbar nerves. Recent evidence support that this nerve arises from dorsal divisions.

It descends along the medial border of the psoas major, crosses the superior ramus of the pubis, and passes under the pectineus, where it divides into numerous branches.

One of these supplies the pectineus, penetrating its deep surface, another is distributed to the hip-joint; while a third communicates with the anterior branch of the obturator nerve.

Occasionally the accessory obturator nerve is very small and is lost in the capsule of the hip-joint.

When it is absent, the hip-joint receives two branches from the obturator nerve.
