= Cutaneous branch of the obturator nerve =

Nerve in the human body

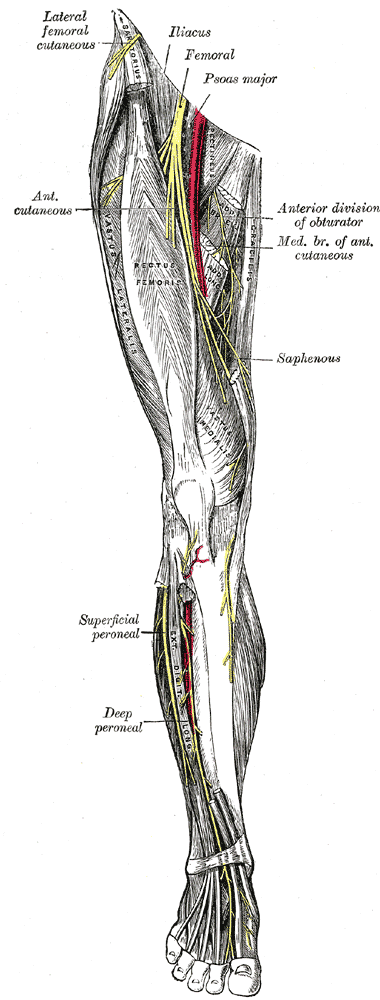
- Nerves of the right lower extremity. Front view. (Cutaneous branch not labeled, but region is visible.)

Details
- From: anterior branch of obturator nerve

Identifiers
- Latin: ramus cutaneus nervi obturatorii
- TA98: A14.2.07.014
- TA2: 6534
- FMA: 45312 45331, 45312

The cutaneous branch of the obturator nerve is an occasional continuation of the communicating branch to the femoral medial cutaneous branches and saphenous branches of the femoral to the thigh and leg. When present it emerges from beneath the distal/inferior border of the adductor longus muscle and descends along the posterior margin of the sartorius muscle to the medial side of the knee where it pierces the deep fascia and communicates with the saphenous nerve. When present, it provides sensory innervation to the skin of proximal/superior half of the medial side of the leg.

== See also ==
- Cutaneous innervation of the lower limbs#Thigh
