= Anterior branch of obturator nerve =

Nerve branch in the pelvis and leg

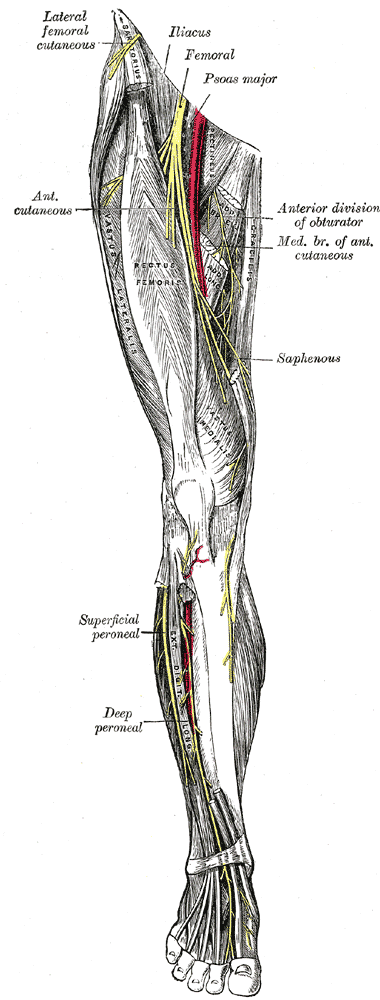
- Nerves of the right leg seen from the front

Details
- From: Obturator nerve

Identifiers
- Latin: Ramus anterior nervi obturatorii
- TA98: A14.2.07.013
- TA2: 6533
- FMA: 45306

The anterior branch of the obturator nerve is a branch of the obturator nerve found in the pelvis and leg.

It leaves the pelvis in front of the obturator externus and descends anterior to the adductor brevis, and posterior to the pectineus and adductor longus; at the lower border of the latter muscle it communicates with the anterior cutaneous and saphenous branches of the femoral nerve, forming a kind of plexus.

It then descends upon the femoral artery, to which it is finally distributed. Near the obturator foramen the nerve gives off an articular branch to the hip joint.

Behind the pectineus muscle, it distributes branches to the adductor longus and gracilis, and usually to the adductor brevis, and in rare cases to the pectineus; it receives a communicating branch from the accessory obturator nerve when that nerve is present.
