= Medial compartment of thigh =

One of the fascial compartments of the thigh

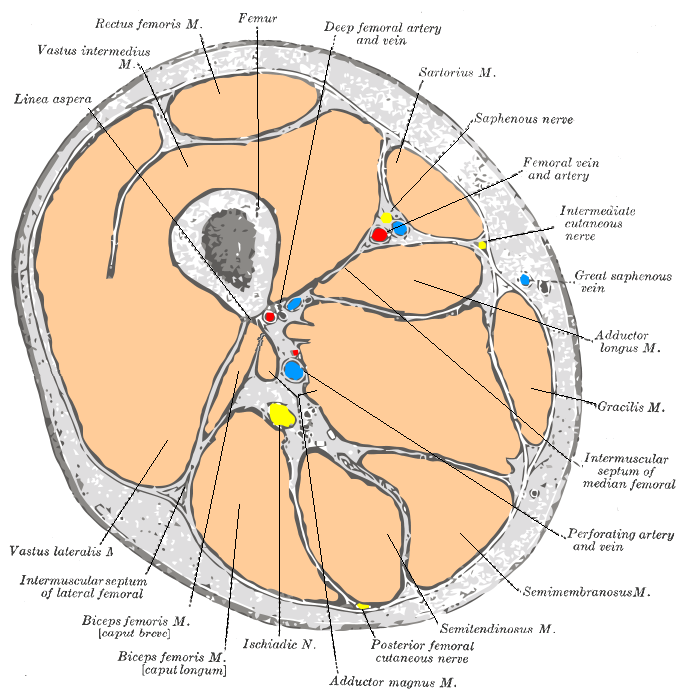
- Cross-section through the middle of the thigh. (Medial compartment is at center right.)

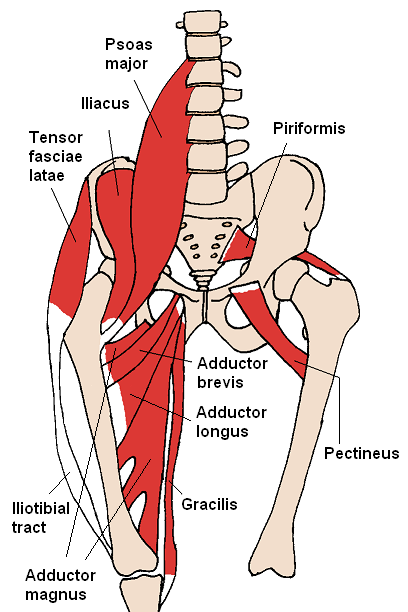
- Anterior hip muscles

Details
- Artery: Obturator artery
- Nerve: Obturator nerve (femoral nerve for pectineus muscle)

Identifiers
- Latin: compartimentum femoris mediale
- TA98: A04.7.01.004
- TA2: 2626
- FMA: 45160

The medial compartment of thigh is one of the fascial compartments of the thigh and contains the hip adductor muscles and the gracilis muscle.

The obturator nerve is the primary nerve supplying this compartment. The obturator artery is the blood supply to the medial thigh.

The muscles in the compartment are:

- gracilis
- adductor longus
- adductor brevis
- adductor magnus

The obturator externus muscle is sometimes considered part of this group, and sometimes excluded. (Spatially, it is in this location, but functionally, it is more similar to the other lateral rotator group muscles).

The pectineus is sometimes included in this group, and sometimes excluded. It has the same function as the others in this group, but different innervation – namely, the femoral nerve.
