= Pectineal line (femur) =

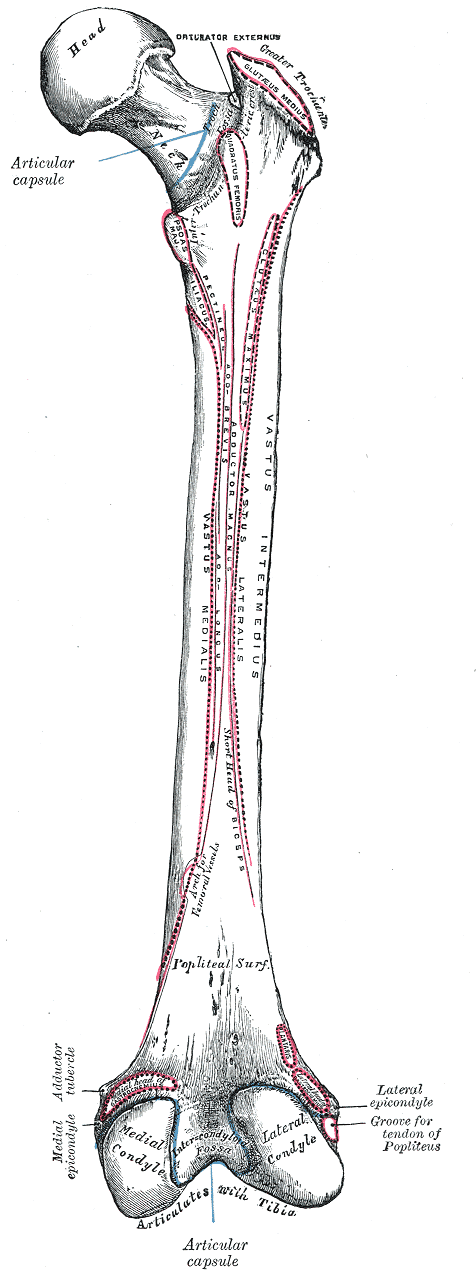
- Right femur. Posterior surface.

Details

Identifiers
- Latin: linea pectinea
- TA98: A02.5.04.016
- TA2: 1375
- FMA: 43724

On the posterior surface of the femur, the intermediate ridge or pectineal line is continued to the base of the lesser trochanter and gives attachment to the pectineus muscle.
