= Pubic tubercle =

Rounded outgrowth on the pubic bone

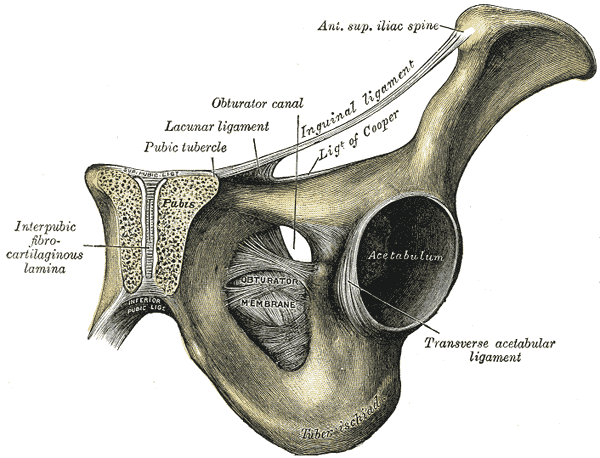
- Pubic symphysis exposed by a coronal section. (Pubic tubercle labeled at upper left.)

- Pelvis. Pubic tubercle is 4d.

Details

Identifiers
- Latin: tuberculum pubicum ossis pubis
- TA98: A02.5.01.303
- TA2: 1348
- FMA: 16953

The pubic tubercle is a prominent tubercle on the superior ramus of the pubis bone of the pelvis.

== Structure ==
The pubic tubercle is a prominent forward-projecting tubercle on the upper border of the medial portion of the superior ramus of the pubis bone. The inguinal ligament attaches to it. Part of the abdominal external oblique muscle inserts onto it. The inferior epigastric artery passes between the pubic tubercle and the anterior superior iliac spine. The pubic spine is a rough ridge that extends from the pubic tubercle to the upper border of the pubic symphysis.

== Clinical significance ==
The pubic tubercle may be palpated. It serves as a landmark for local anaesthetic of the genital branch of the genitofemoral nerve, which lies slightly lateral to the pubic tubercle. This may also be used for the obturator nerve.

=== Hernias ===
The pubic tubercle is a useful landmark for identifying hernias. An inguinal hernia will lie anteromedial to the pubic tubercle. A femoral hernia will lie inferolateral to the pubic tubercle.
