= Pectineus muscle =

Adductor of the thigh

Pectineus
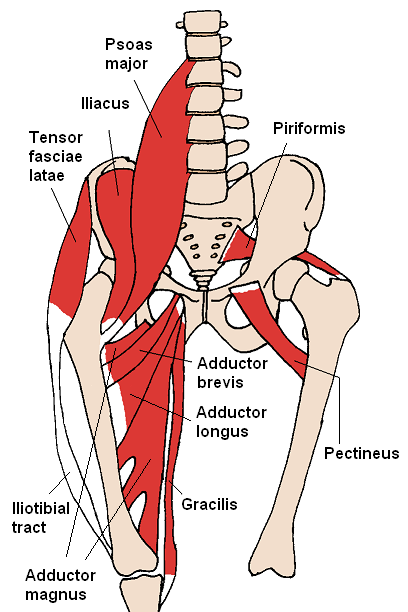
- The pectineus and nearby muscles

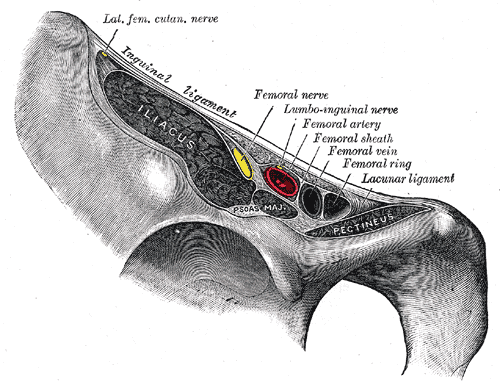
- Structures passing behind the inguinal ligament (pectineus visible at bottom right.)

Details
- Origin: Pectineal line of the pubic bone
- Insertion: Pectineal line of the femur
- Artery: Obturator artery
- Nerve: Femoral nerve, sometimes obturator nerve
- Actions: Thigh - flexion, adduction, external rotation

Identifiers
- Latin: musculus pectineus
- TA98: A04.7.02.025
- TA2: 2627
- FMA: 22440

The pectineus muscle (/pɛkˈtɪniəs/, from the Latin word pecten, meaning comb) is a flat, quadrangular muscle, situated at the anterior (front) part of the upper and medial (inner) aspect of the thigh. The pectineus muscle is the most anterior adductor of the hip. The muscle's primary action is hip flexion; it also produces adduction and external rotation of the hip.

It can be classified in the medial compartment of thigh (when the function is emphasized) or the anterior compartment of thigh (when the nerve supply is emphasized).

== Structure ==
The pectineus muscle arises from the pectineal line of the pubis and to a slight extent from the surface of bone in front of it, between the iliopectineal eminence and pubic tubercle, and from the fascia covering the anterior surface of the muscle; the fibers pass downward, backward, and lateral, to be inserted into the pectineal line of the femur which leads from the lesser trochanter to the linea aspera.

=== Relations ===
The pectineus is in relation by its anterior surface with the pubic portion of the fascia lata, which separates it from the femoral artery and vein and internal saphenous vein, and lower down with the profunda femoris artery.

By its posterior surface with the capsule of the hip joint, and with the obturator externus and adductor brevis, the obturator artery and vein being interposed.

By its external border with the psoas major, the femoral artery resting upon the line of interval.

By its internal border with the outer edge of the adductor longus.

Obturator foramen is situated directly behind this muscle, which forms one of its coverings.

It forms part of the floor of the femoral triangle.

=== Innervation ===
The lumbar plexus is formed from the anterior rami of nerves L1 to L4 and some fibers from T12. With only five roots and two divisions, it is less complex than the brachial plexus and gives rise to a number of nerves including the femoral nerve and accessory obturator nerve. The pectineus muscle is considered a composite muscle as the innervation is by the femoral nerve (L2 and L3) and occasionally (20% of the population) a branch of the obturator nerve called the accessory obturator nerve. When it is present, the accessory obturator nerve innervates a portion of the pectineus muscle, entering the muscle on its dorsomedial aspect. The greater nerve to the muscle is the femoral nerve. Unlike the obturator accessory nerve, the femoral nerve is always present and provides the sole innervation for the pectineus muscle in over 90% of cases. The muscle is also innervated by the accessory obturator nerve in the 8.7% of cases in which the nerve occurs.

== Function ==
Its primary functions are contributing to hip flexion and hip adduction. Secondarily, it also internally rotates the thigh.

== Injury ==
In sports medicine the pectineus muscle forms part of the PLAC concept. The pectineus muscle can be injured in isolation, although rarely: more commonly the pectineus muscle is injured in association with adductor longus avulsions or injuries to the PLAC complex.

== Additional images ==
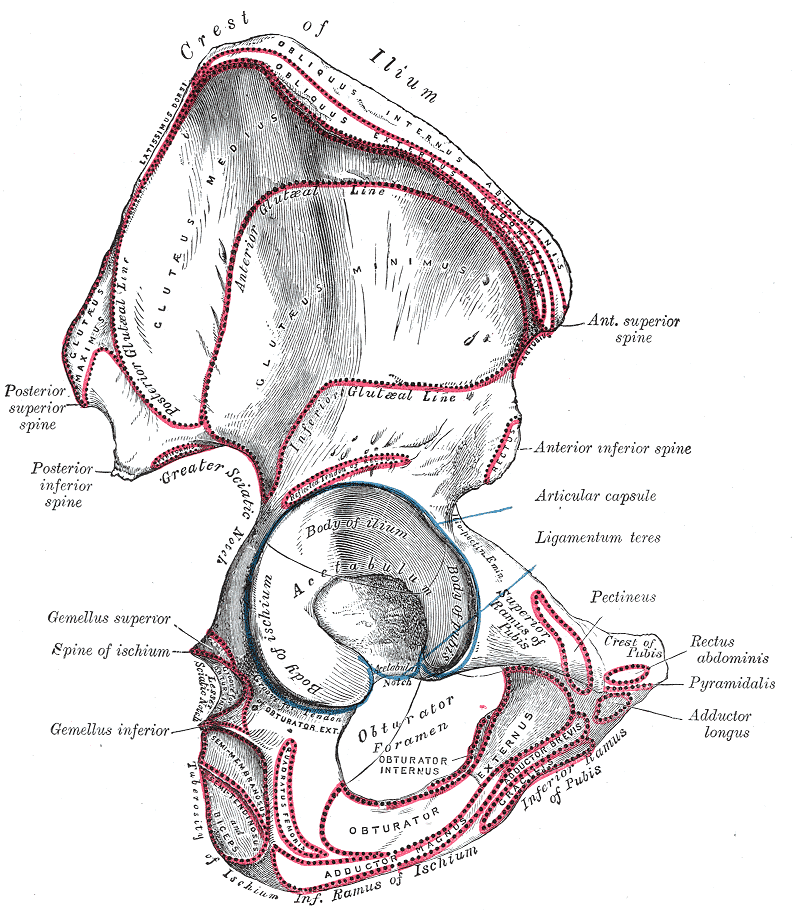
Right hip bone. External surface.

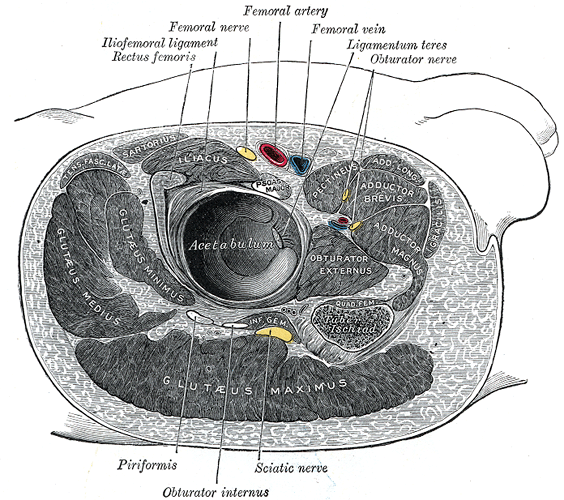
Structures surrounding right hip-joint.

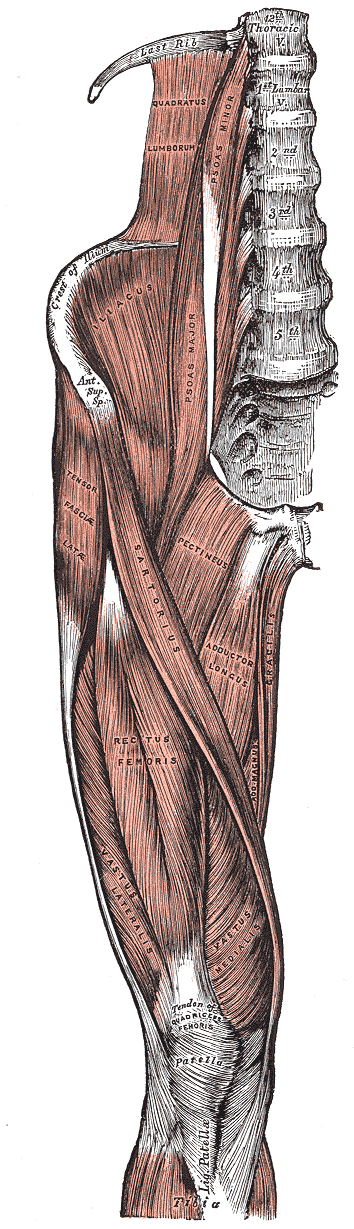
Muscles of the iliac and anterior femoral regions.

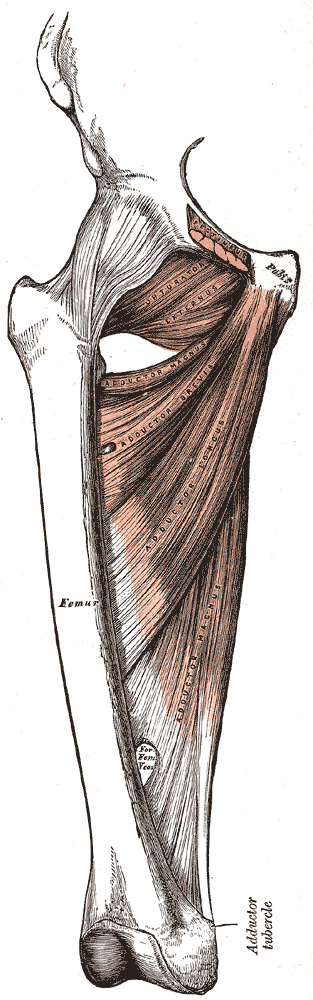
Deep muscles of the medial femoral region.

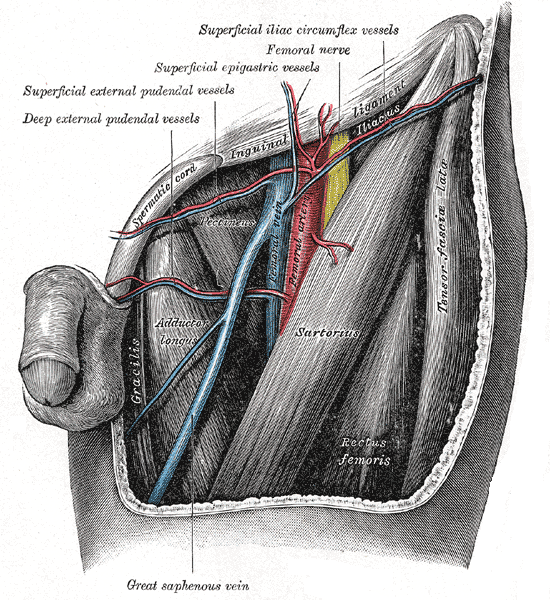
The left femoral triangle.

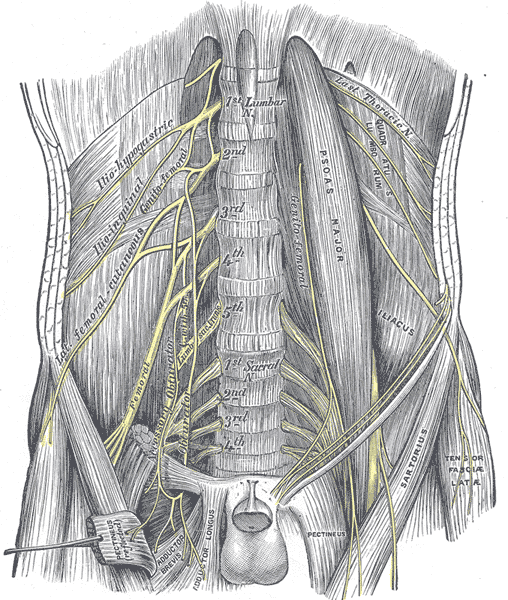
The lumbar plexus and its branches.

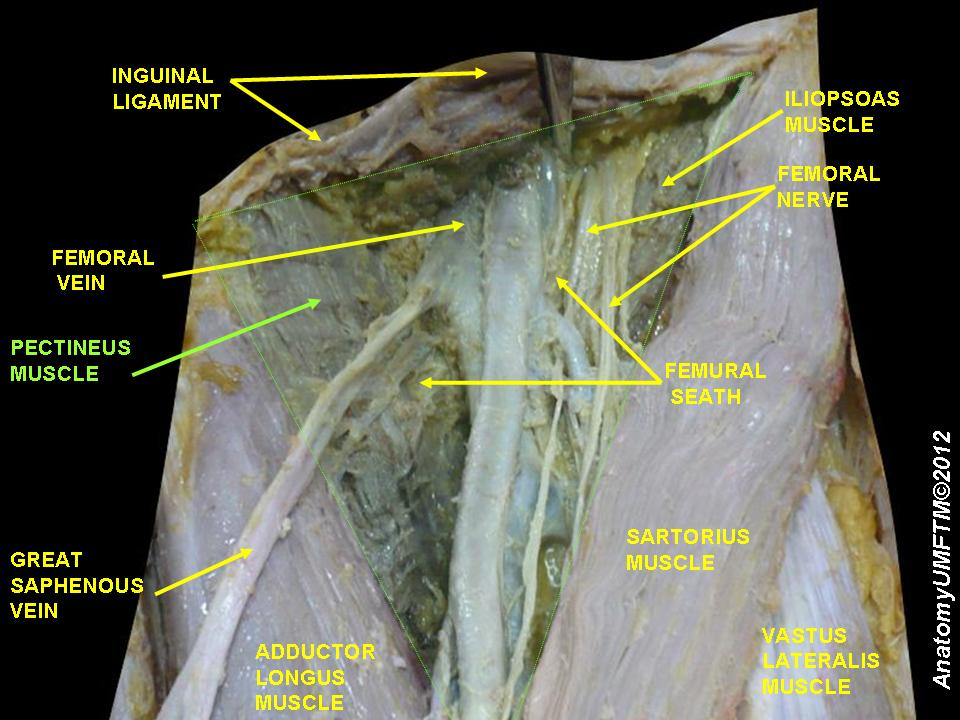
Pectineus muscle

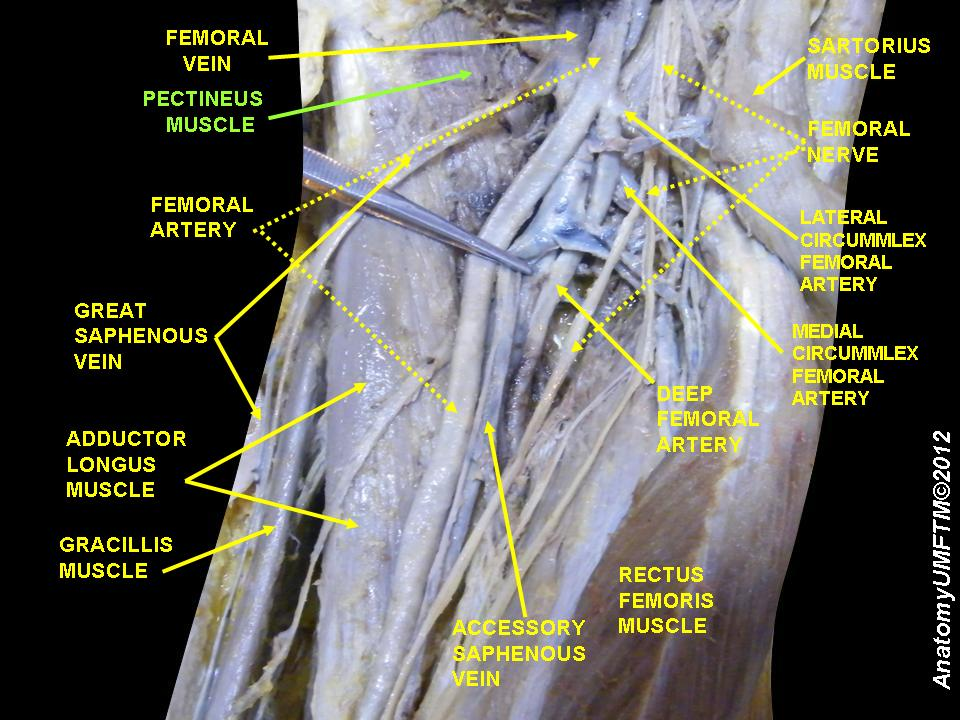
Pectineus muscle

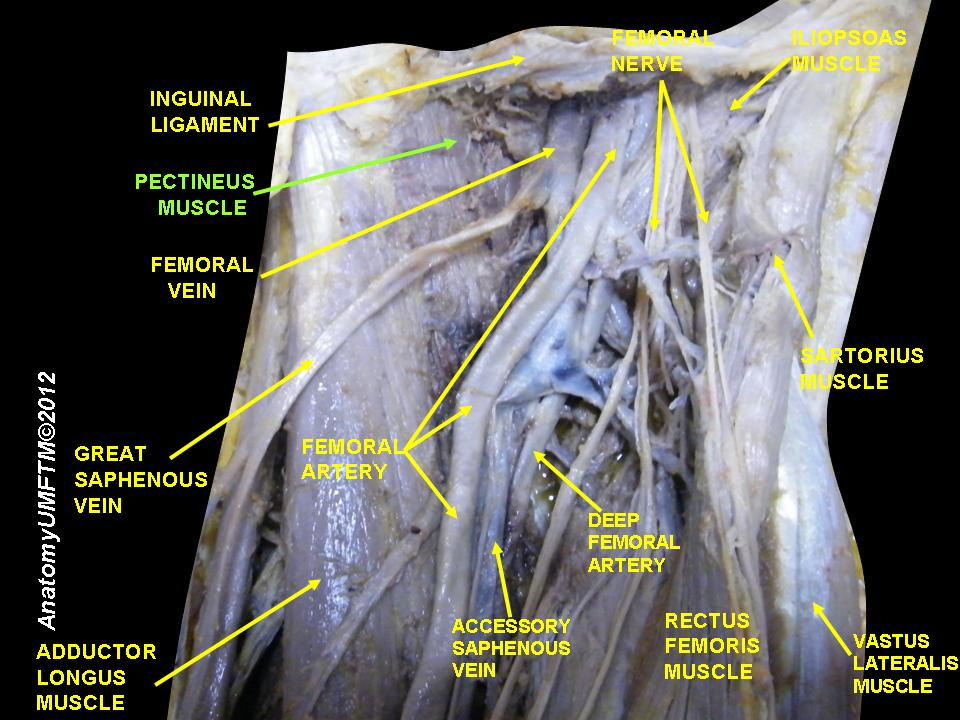
Pectineus muscle

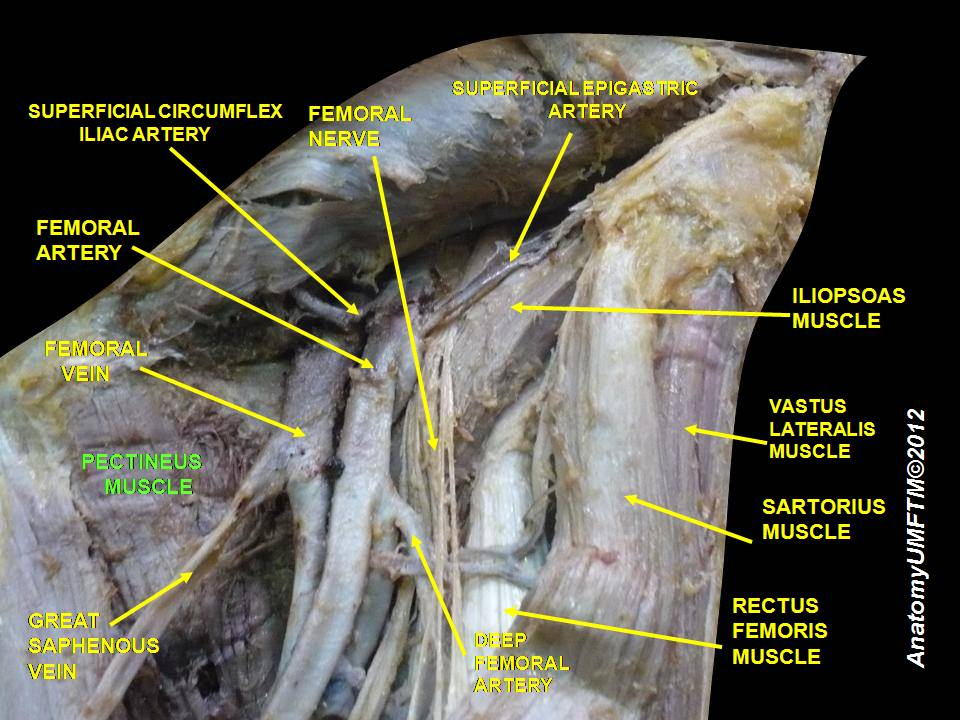
Pectineus muscle

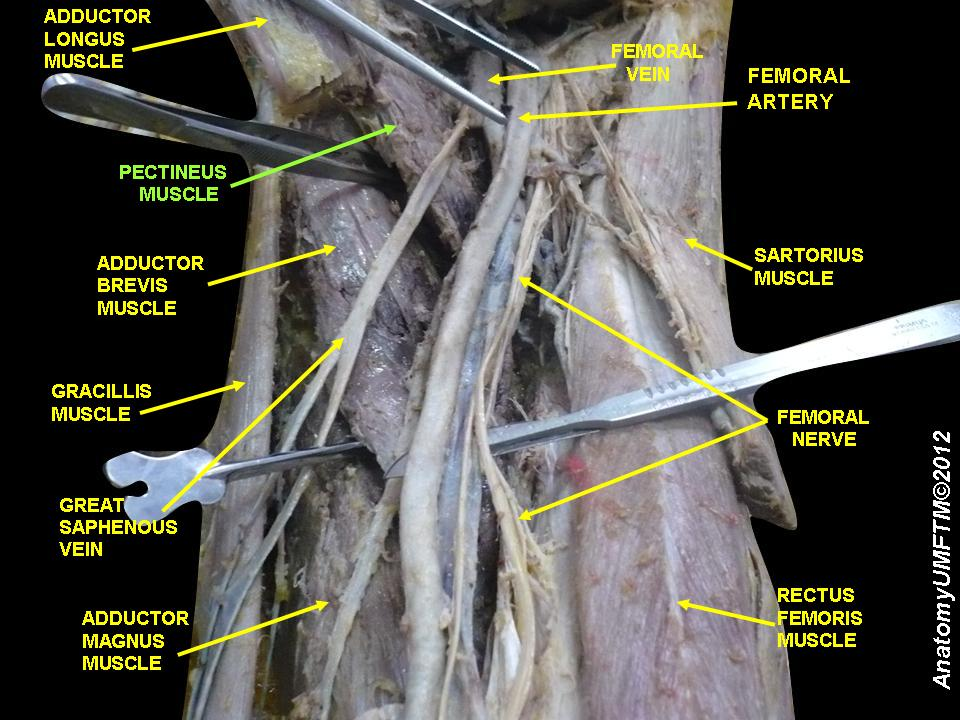
Pectineus muscle

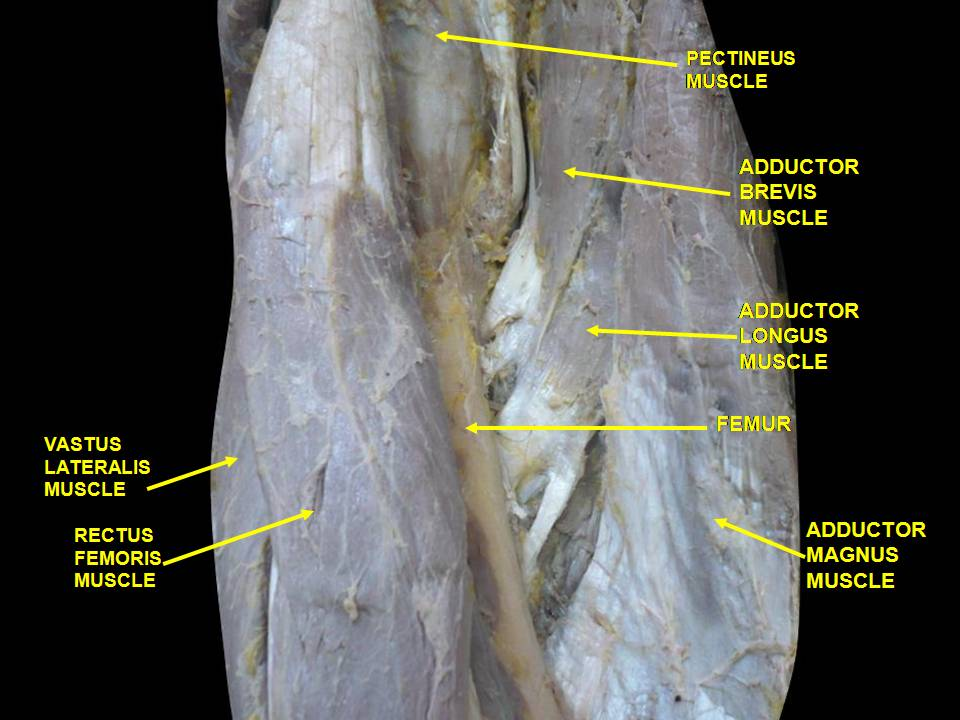
Muscles of thigh. Anterior views

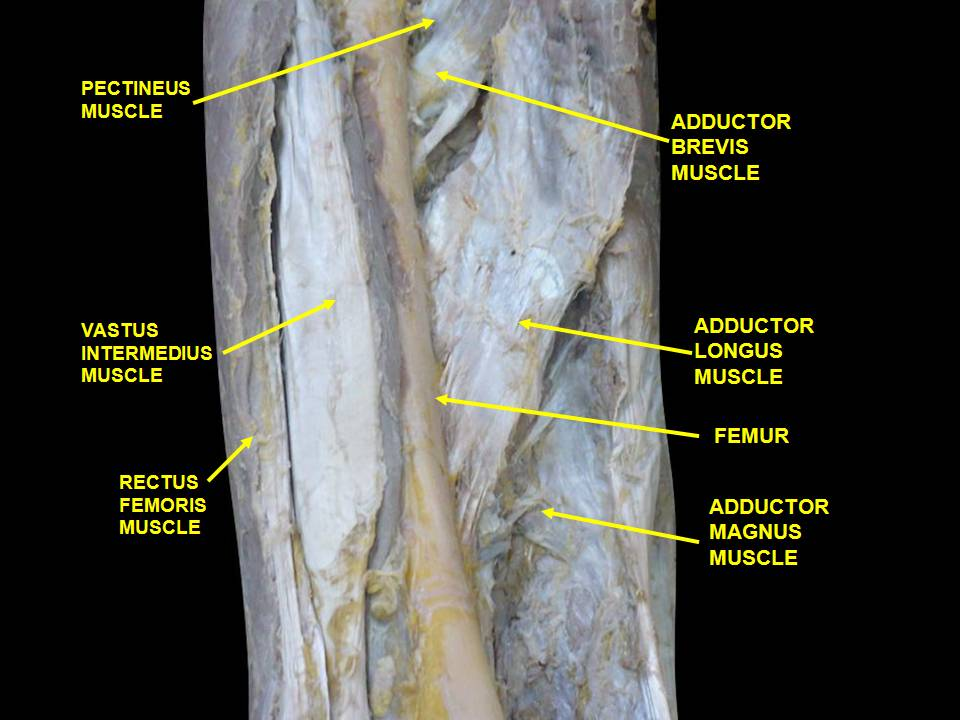
Muscles of thigh. Anterior views.

== See also ==
- Thigh
- PLAC concept

== Notes ==
- Woodburne, Russell (1960). "The Accessory Obturator Nerve and the Innervation of the Pectineus Muscle" (PDF). Michigan Library Med School. 136 (3): 367–369. doi:10.1002/ar.1091360303. hdl:2027.42/49789. PMID 13845846. S2CID 14846721.
- Saladin, Kenneth S. Anatomy & Physiology: The Unity of Form and Function. New York, NY: McGraw-Hill, 2007. pg.493. Print.
