= Obturator nerve =

Nerve in human anatomy

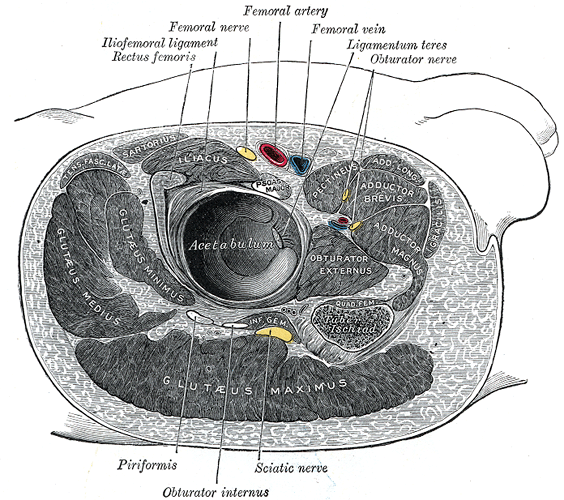
- Structures surrounding right hip-joint. (Obturator nerve labeled at upper right.)

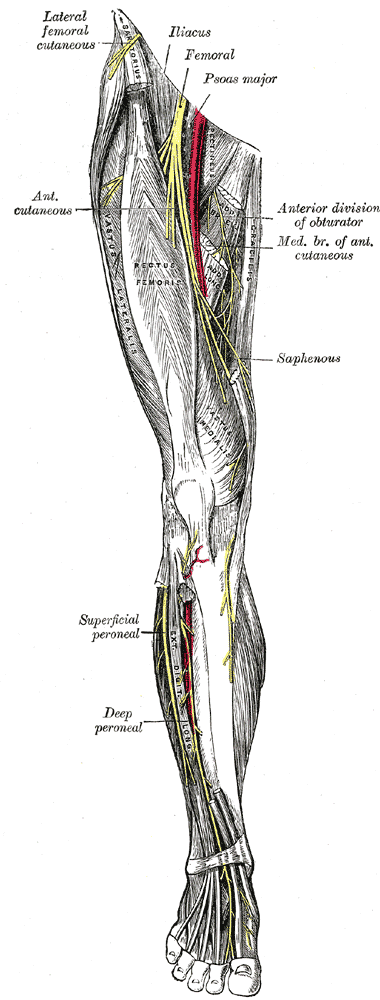
- Nerves of the right lower extremity. Front view.

Details
- From: Lumbar plexus L2-L4
- To: Posterior branch of obturator nerve, anterior branch of obturator nerve
- Innervates: Medial compartment of thigh

Identifiers
- Latin: nervus obturatorius
- MeSH: D009776
- TA98: A14.2.07.012
- TA2: 6532
- FMA: 16487

The obturator nerve in human anatomy arises from the ventral divisions of the second, third, and fourth lumbar nerves in the lumbar plexus; the branch from the third is the largest, while that from the second is often very small.

== Structure ==
The obturator nerve originates from the anterior divisions of the L2, L3, and L4 spinal nerve roots. It descends through the fibers of the psoas major, and emerges from its medial border near the brim of the pelvis. It then passes behind the common iliac arteries, and on the lateral side of the internal iliac artery and vein, and runs along the lateral wall of the lesser pelvis, above and in front of the obturator vessels, to the upper part of the obturator foramen.

Here it enters the thigh, through the obturator canal, and divides into an anterior and a posterior branch, which are separated at first by some of the fibers of the obturator externus, and lower down by the adductor brevis.

An accessory obturator nerve may be present in approximately 8% to 29% of the general population.

=== Branches ===
- Anterior branch of obturator nerve
- Posterior branch of obturator nerve
- Cutaneous branch of the obturator nerve

== Function ==
The obturator nerve is responsible for the sensory innervation of the skin of the medial aspect of the thigh.

The nerve is also responsible for the motor innervation of the adductor muscles of the lower limb (external obturator, adductor longus, adductor brevis, adductor magnus, gracilis) and the pectineus (inconstant). It is, notably, not responsible for the innervation of the obturator internus, despite the similarity in name.

== Clinical significance ==
An obturator nerve block may be used during knee surgery and urethral surgery in combination with other anaesthetics.

== Additional images ==
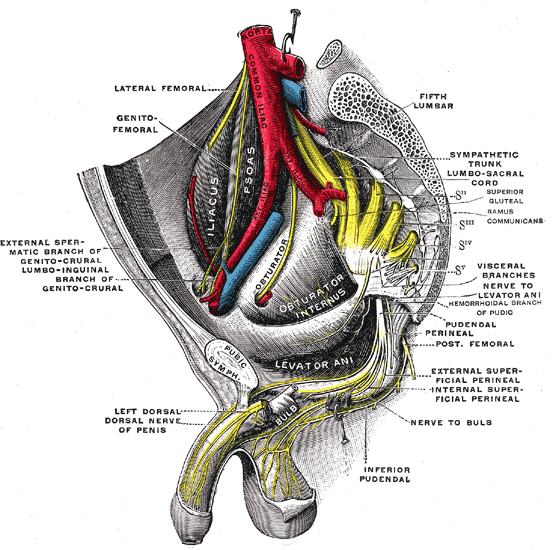
Sacral plexus of the right side.

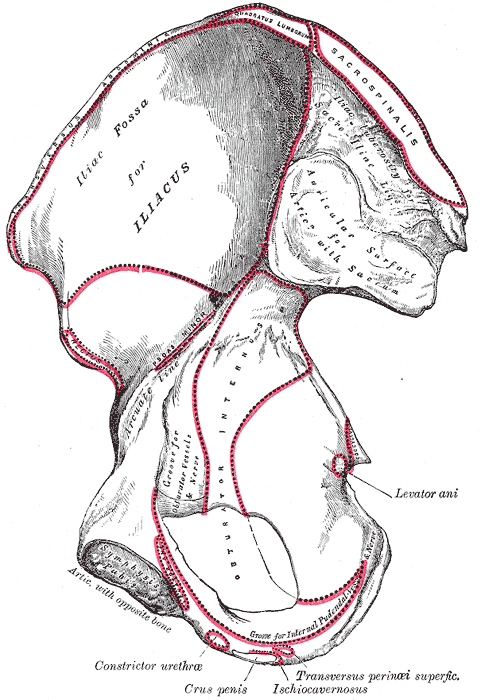
Right hip bone. Internal surface.

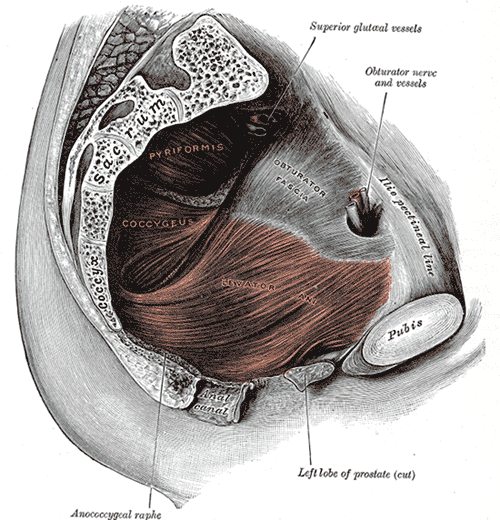
Left Levator ani from within.

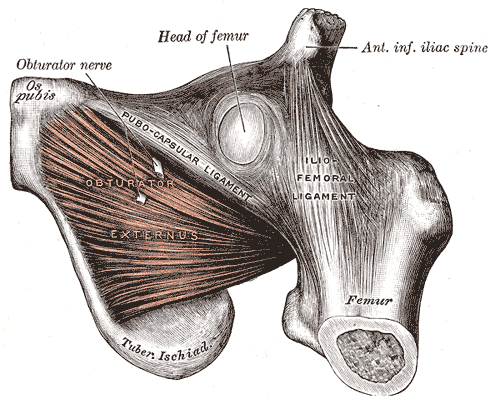
The Obturator externus.

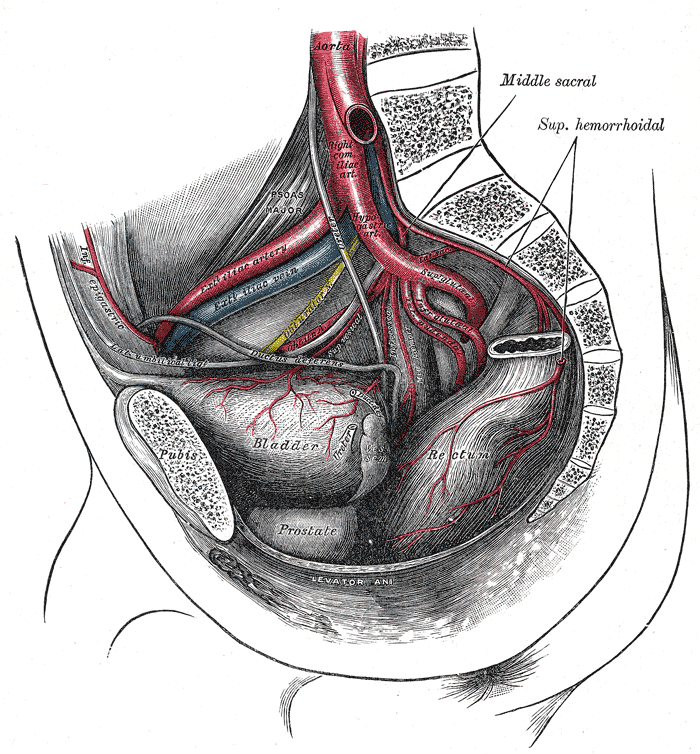
The arteries of the pelvis.

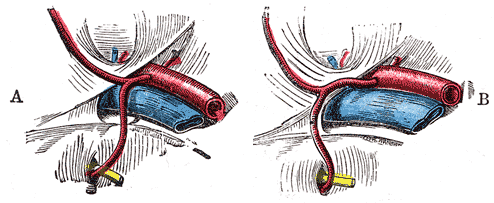
Variations in origin and course of obturator artery.

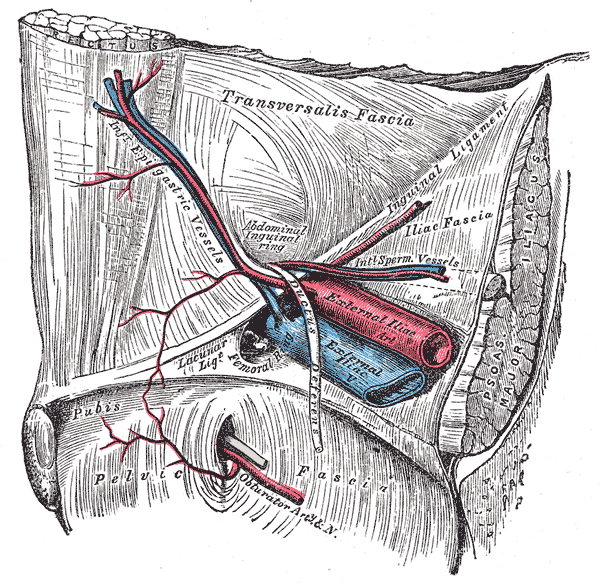
The relations of the femoral and abdominal inguinal rings, seen from within the abdomen. Right side.

Plan of lumbar plexus.

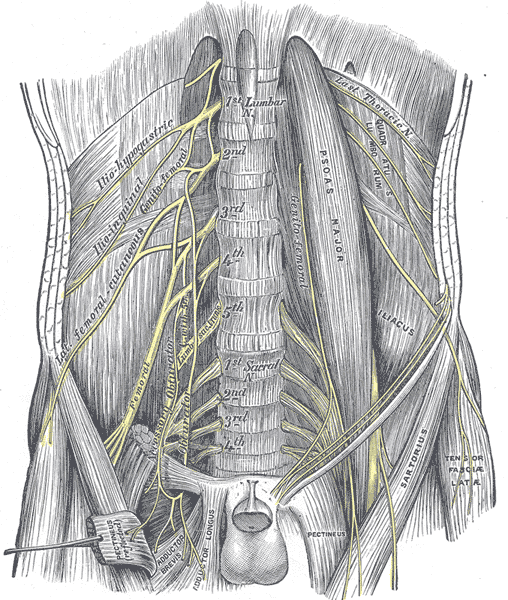
The lumbar plexus and its branches.

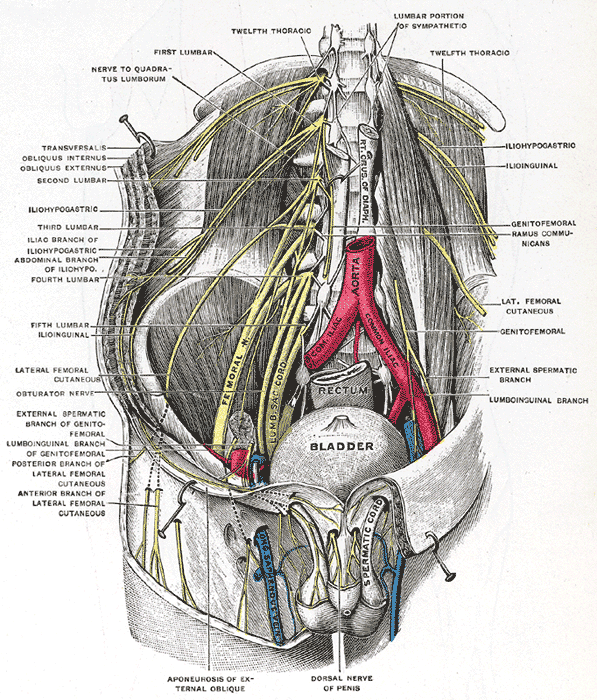
Deep and superficial dissection of the lumbar plexus.

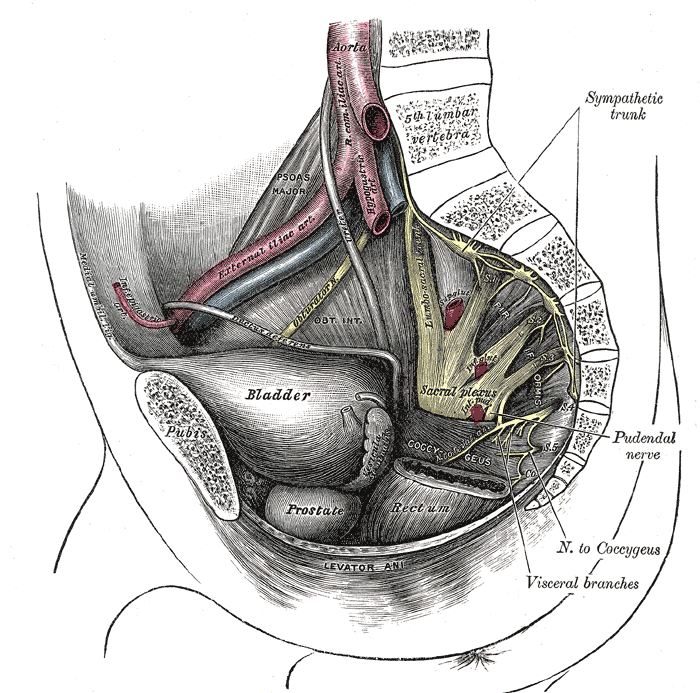
Dissection of side wall of pelvis showing sacral and pudendal plexuses.

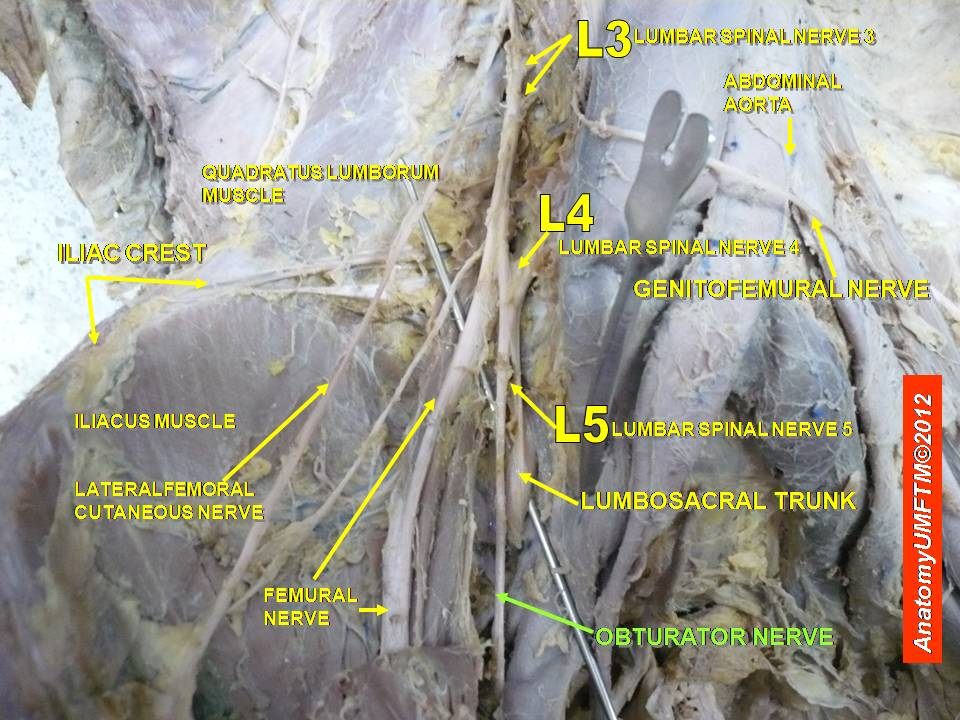
Obturator nerve

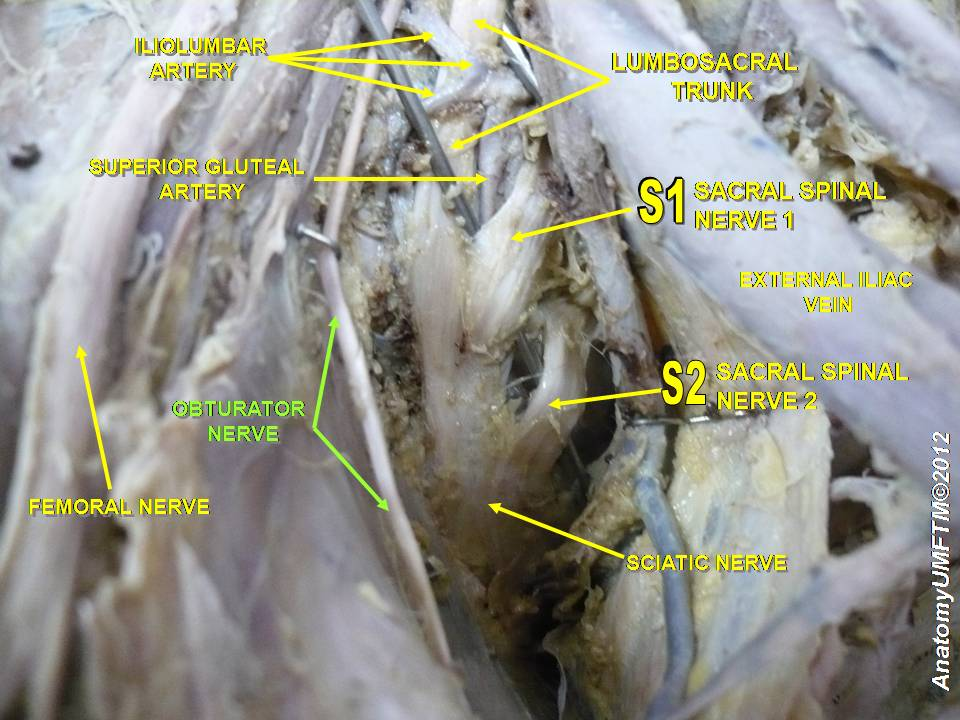
Obturator nerve

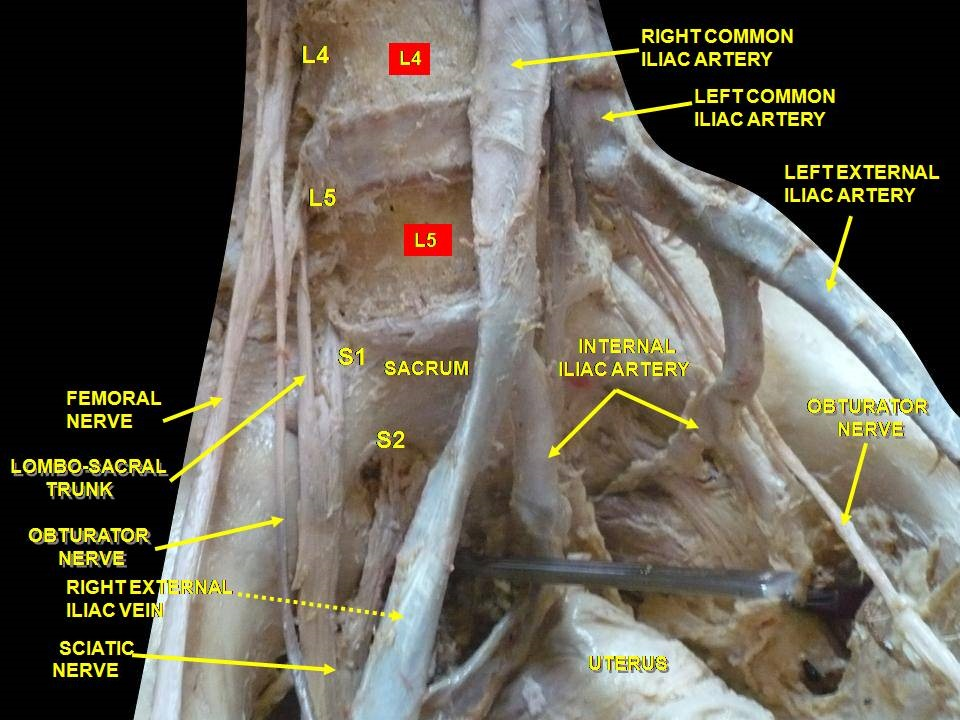
Lumbar and sacral plexus. Deep dissection.Anterior view.

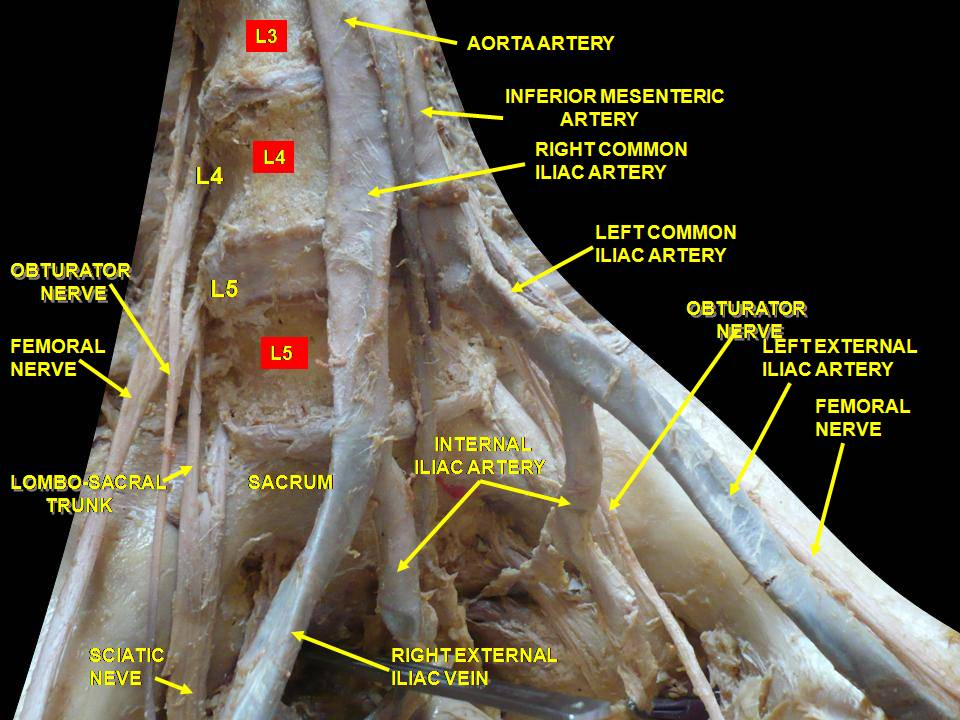
Lumbar and sacral plexus. Deep dissection.Anterior view.

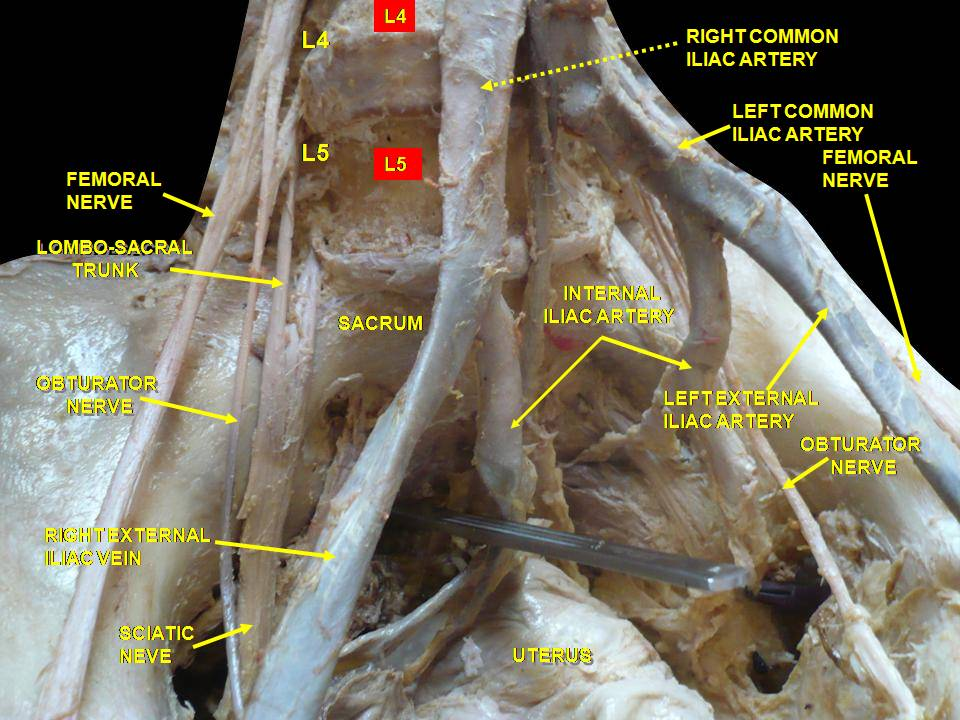
Lumbar and sacral plexus. Deep dissection.Anterior view.

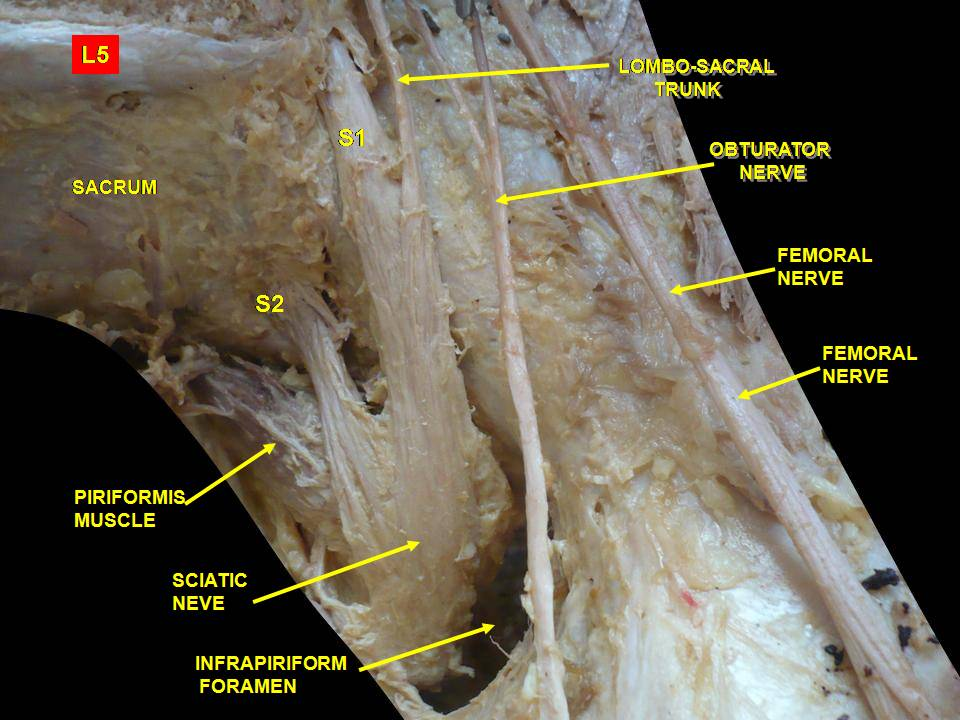
Lumbar and sacral plexus. Deep dissection.Anterior view.

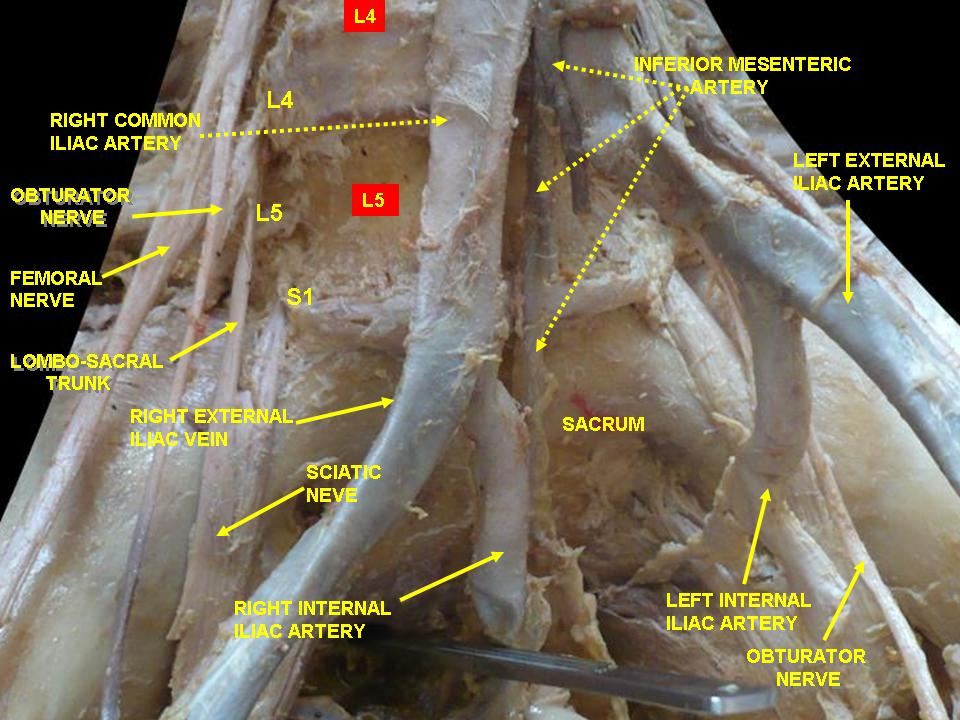
Lumbar and sacral plexus. Deep dissection.Anterior view.

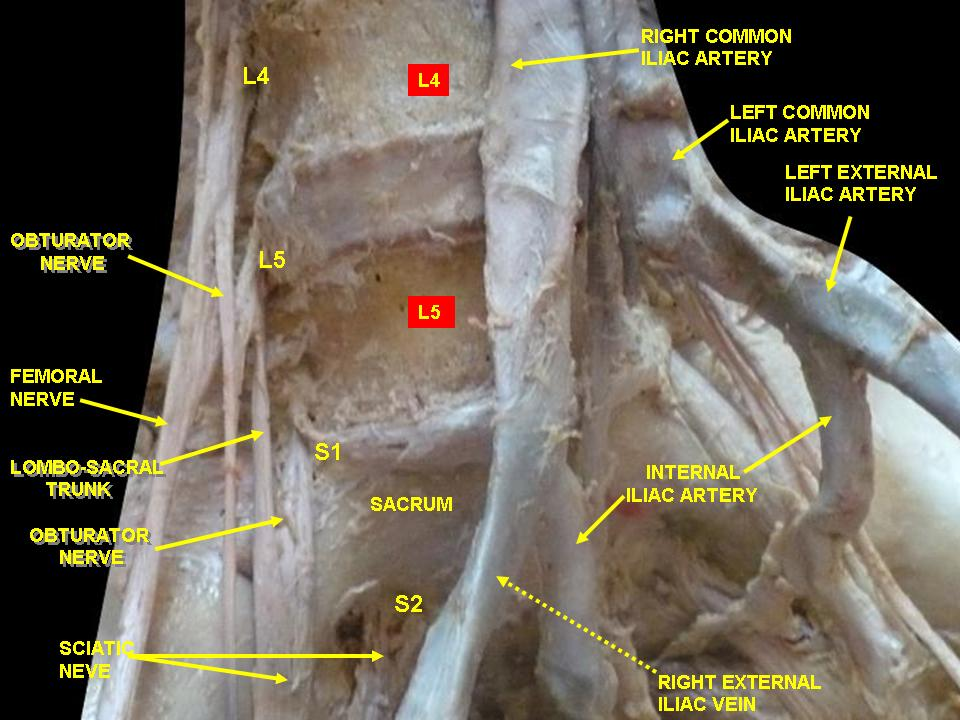
Lumbar and sacral plexus. Deep dissection.Anterior view.

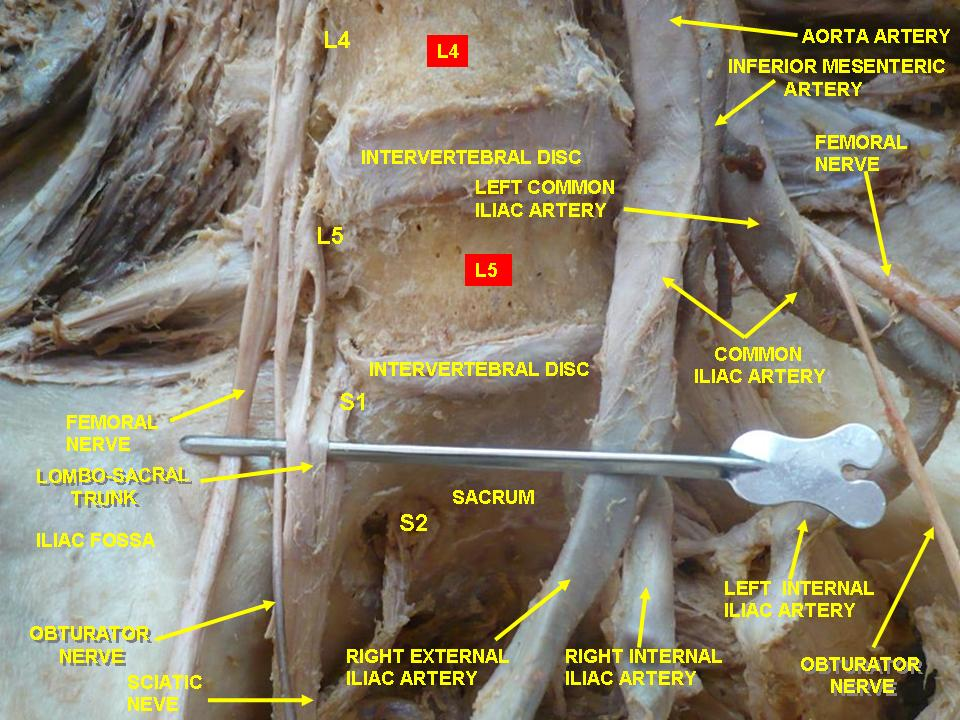
Lumbar and sacral plexus. Deep dissection.Anterior view

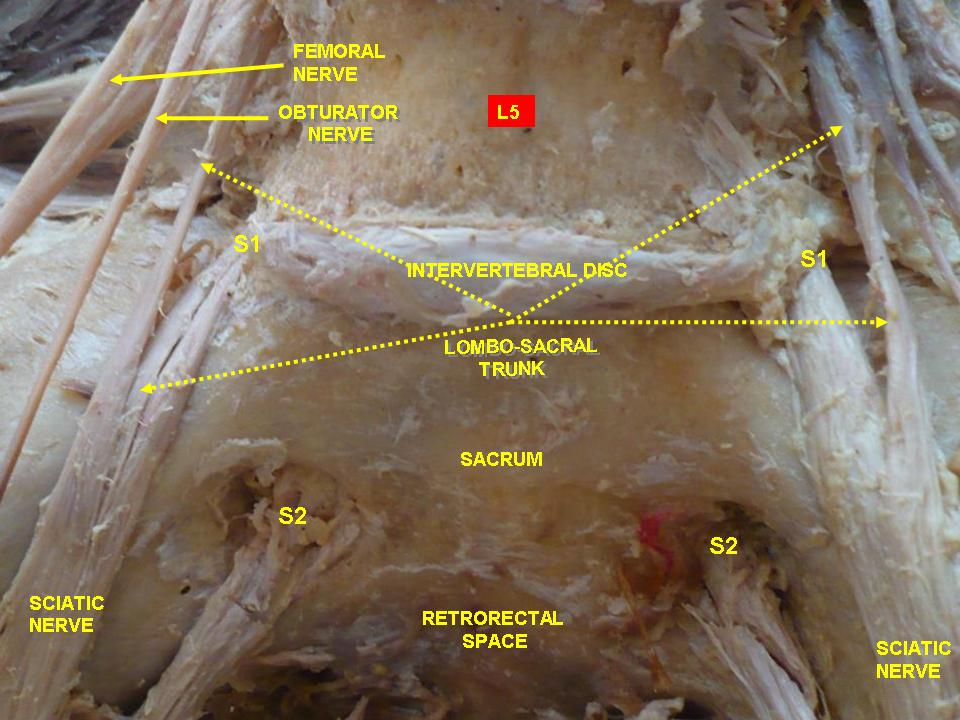
Lumbar and sacral plexus. Deep dissection.Anterior view
