= Adductor longus muscle =

Skeletal muscle located in the thigh

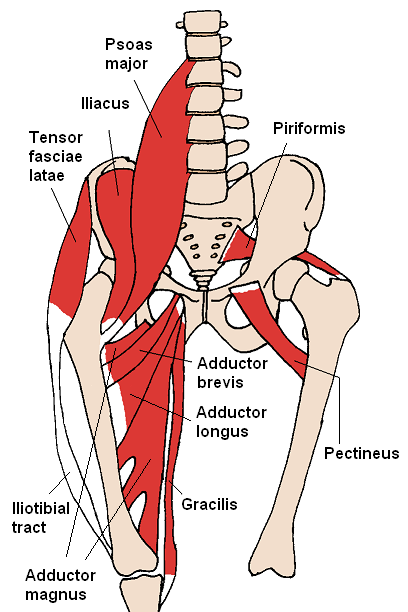
- The adductor longus and nearby muscles

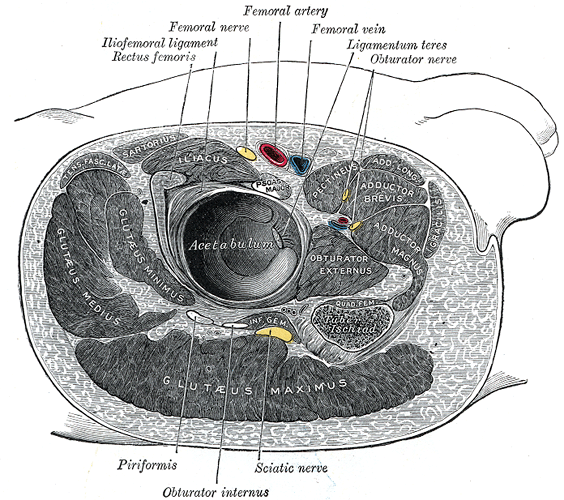
- Structures surrounding right hip-joint. (Adductor longus at upper right.)

Details
- Origin: Pubic body just below the pubic crest
- Insertion: Middle third of linea aspera
- Artery: Deep femoral artery
- Nerve: Anterior branch of obturator nerve
- Actions: Adduction of hip, flexion of hip joint

Identifiers
- Latin: musculus adductor longus
- TA98: A04.7.02.026
- TA2: 2628
- FMA: 22441

In the human body, the adductor longus is a skeletal muscle located in the thigh. One of the adductor muscles of the hip, its main function is to adduct the thigh and it is innervated by the obturator nerve. It forms the medial wall of the femoral triangle.

== Structure ==
The adductor longus arises from the body of pubis inferior to pubic crest and lateral to pubic symphysis.

It lies ventrally on the adductor magnus, and near the femur, the adductor brevis is interposed between these two muscles. Distally, the fibers of the adductor longus extend into the adductor canal.

It is inserted into the middle third of the medial lip of the linea aspera.

=== Innervation ===
As part of the medial compartment of the thigh, the adductor longus is innervated by the anterior division (sometimes the posterior division) of the obturator nerve. The obturator nerve exits via the anterior rami of the spinal cord from L2, L3, and L4.

=== Relations ===
The adductor longus is in relation by its anterior surface with the pubic portion of the fascia lata, and near its insertion with the femoral artery and vein.

By its posterior surface with the adductor brevis and magnus, the anterior branches of the obturator artery, vein, and nerves, and near its insertion with the profunda artery and vein.

By its outer border with the pectineus, and by the inner border with the gracilis.

== Actions ==
Its main actions are to adduct and externally rotate the thigh; it can also produce some degree of flexion/anteversion.

== Development ==
Adductor longus is derived from the myotome of spinal roots L2, L3, and L4.

== Injury ==
In sports medicine the adductor longus muscle forms part of the PLAC complex. The adductor longus can be injured in isolation (PLAC Type 1), but is more commonly damaged in together with the pectineus muscle and PLAC complex: Pyramidalis muscle, anterior pubic ligament and adductor longus muscle and tendon.

== Additional images ==
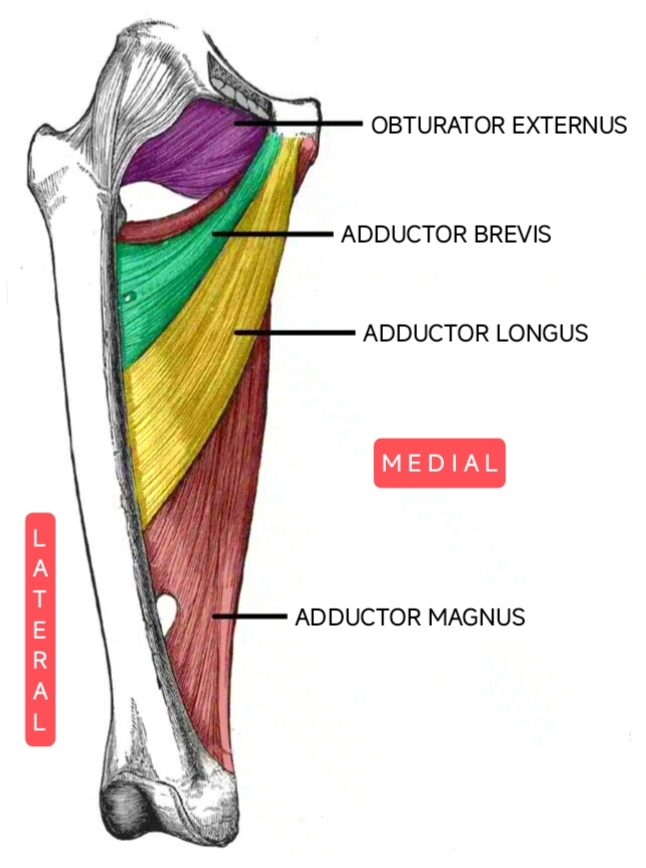
Deep muscles of the medial femoral region; right side, anterior view. (After Gray.)

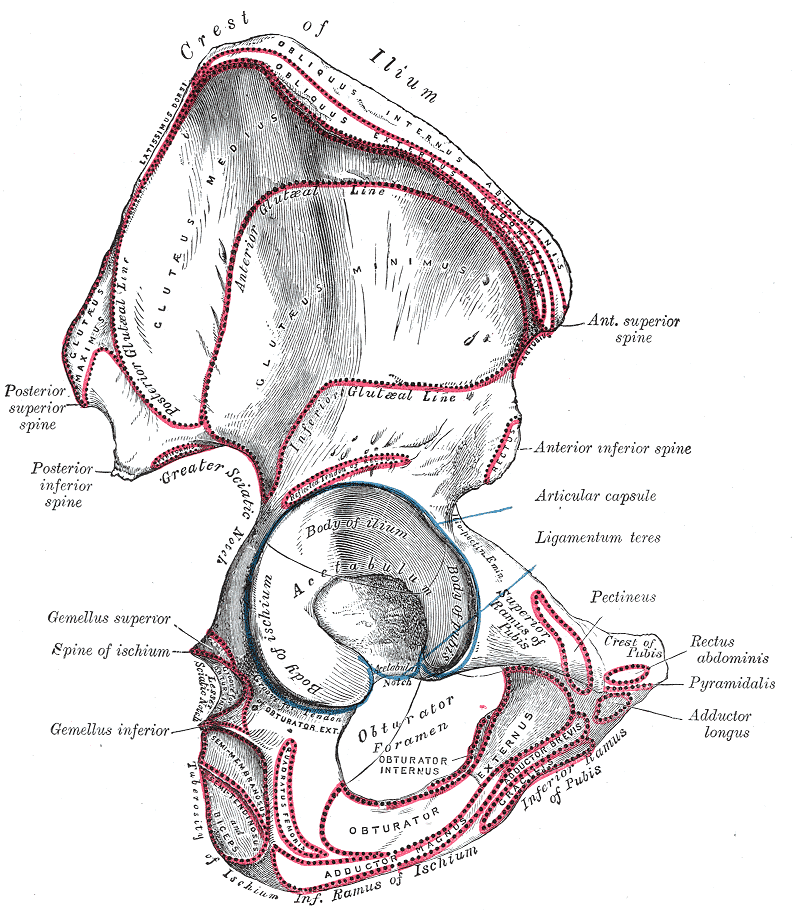
Right hip bone. External surface.

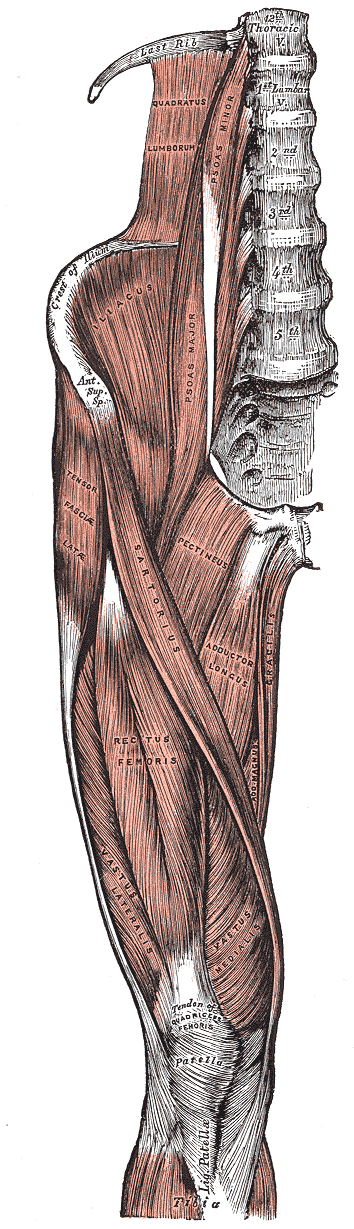
Muscles of the iliac and anterior femoral regions.

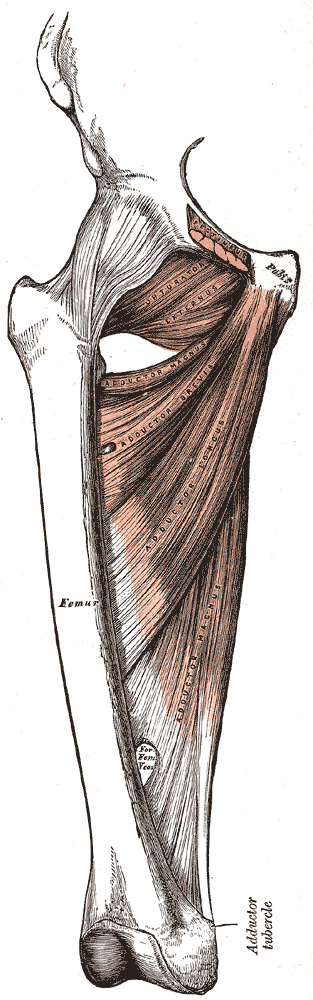
Deep muscles of the medial femoral region.

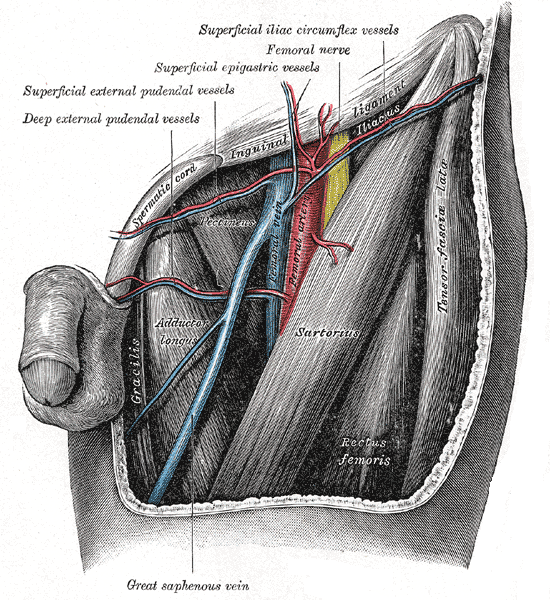
The left femoral triangle.

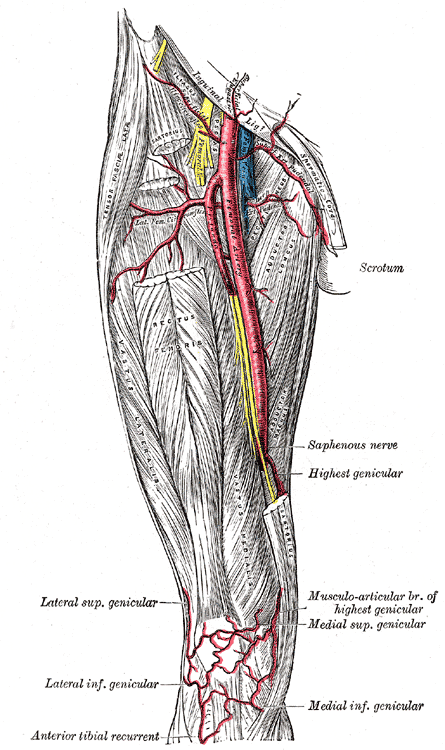
The femoral artery.

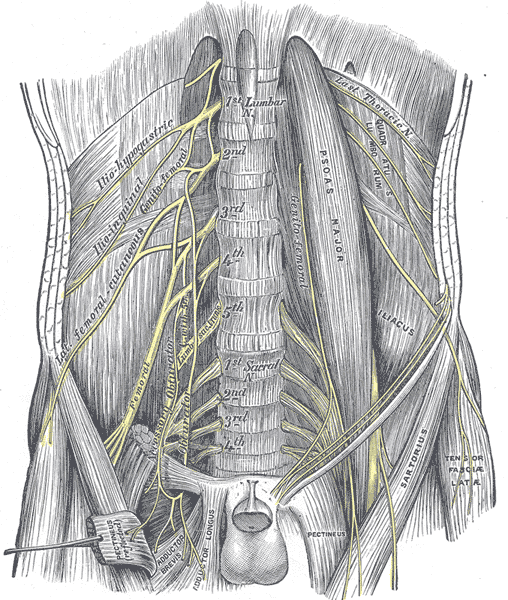
The lumbar plexus and its branches.

Cross section through thigh.

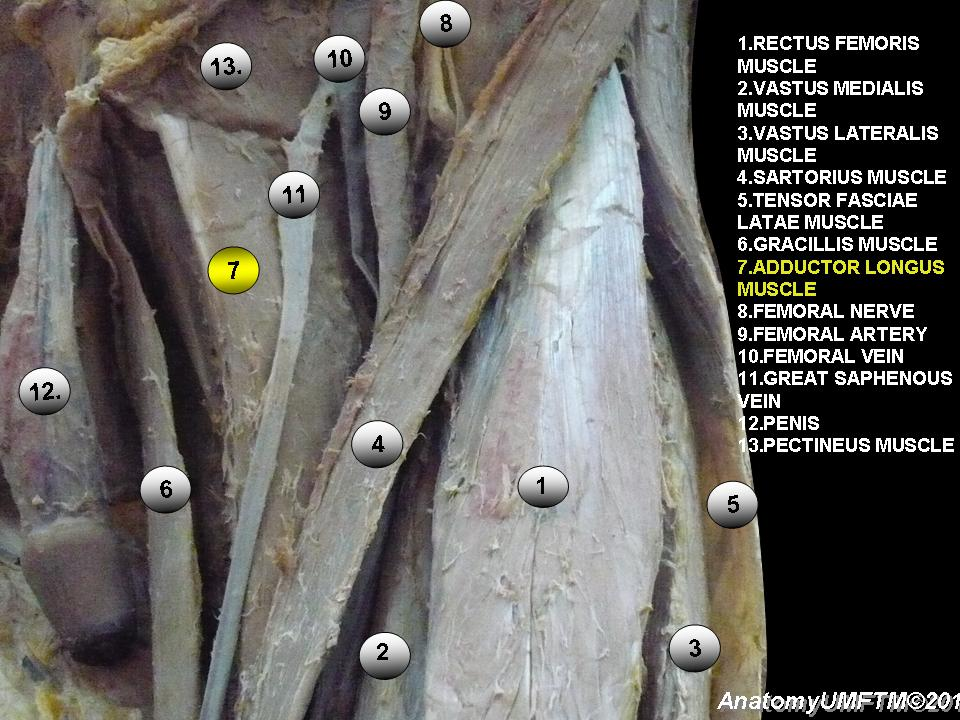
Adductor longus muscle

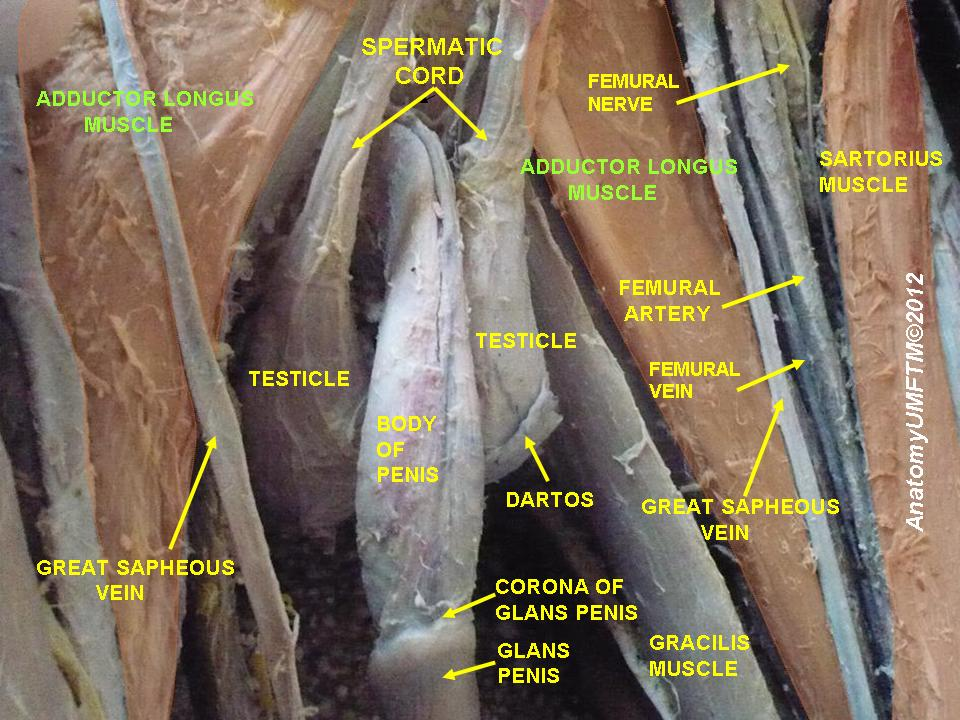
Adductor longus muscle

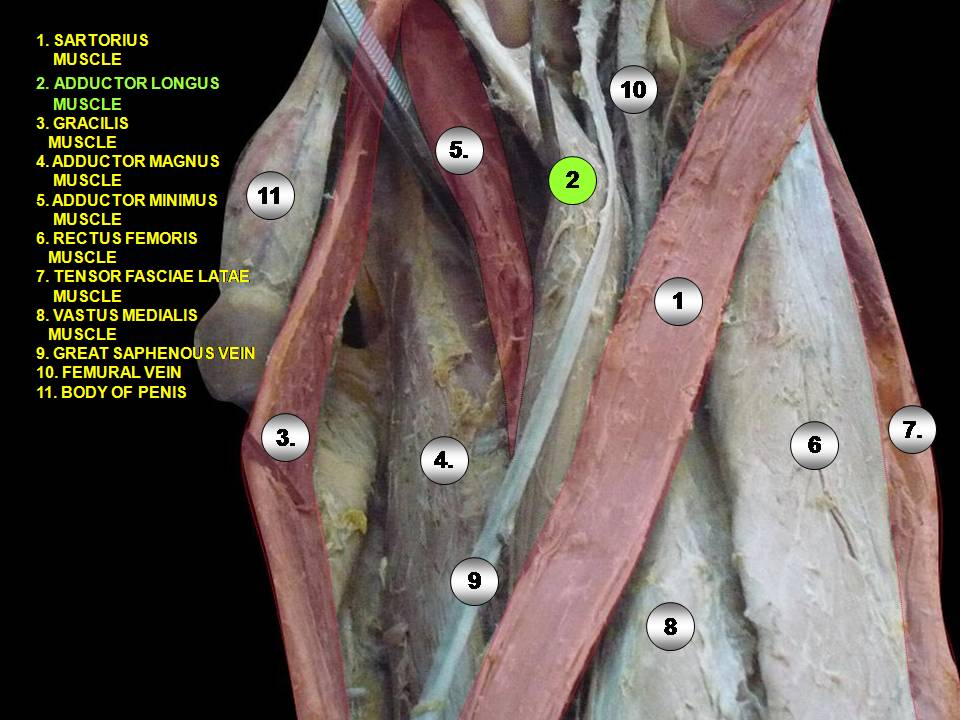
Adductor longus muscle

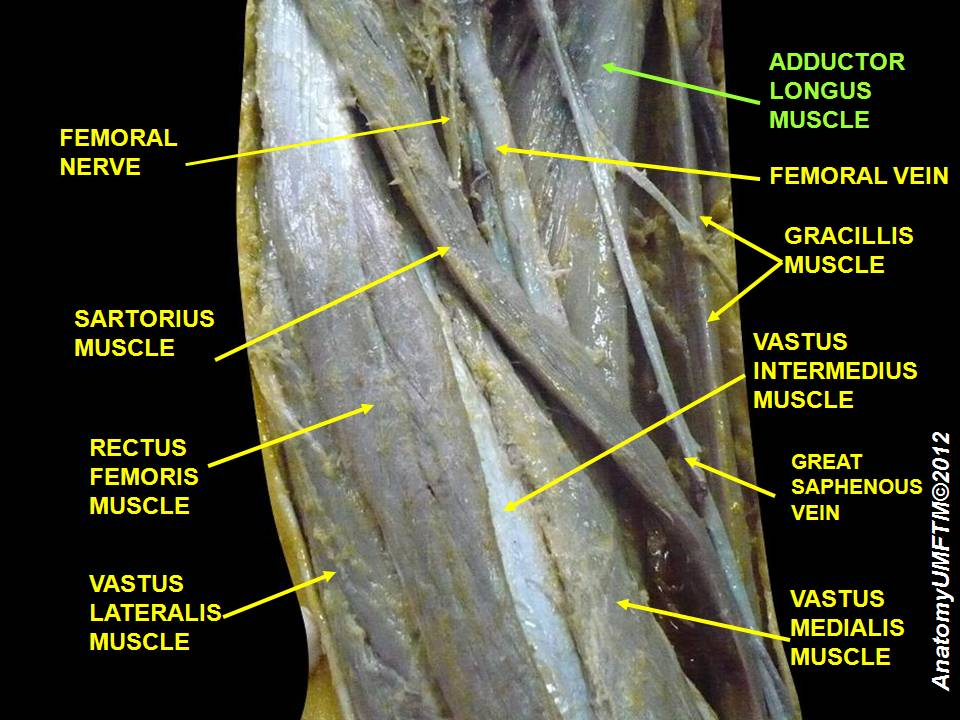
Adductor longus muscle

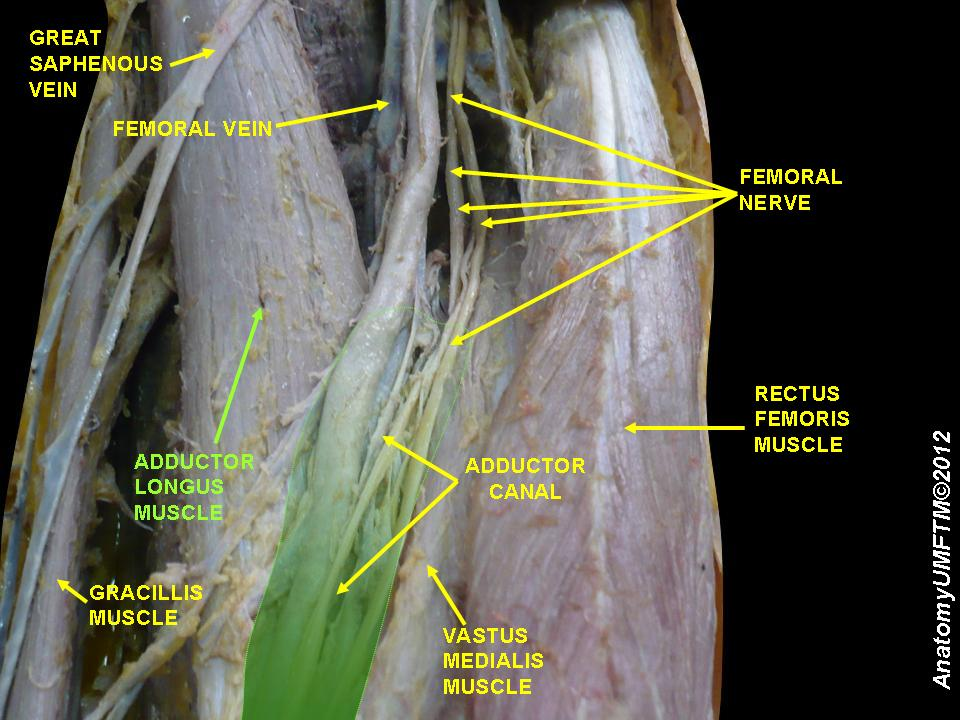
Adductor longus muscle

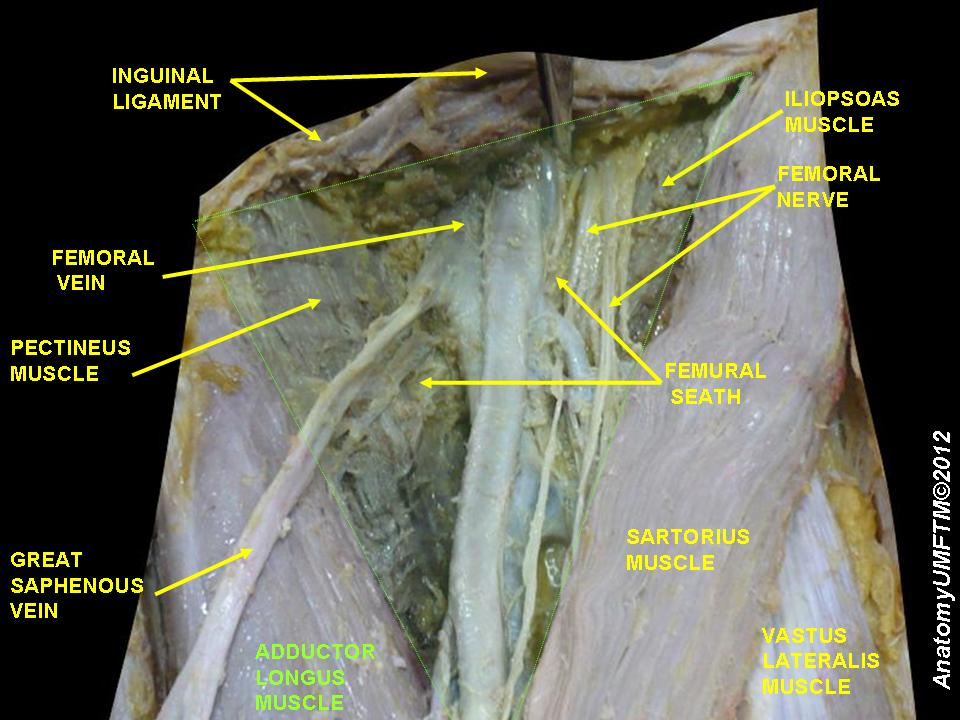
Adductor longus muscle

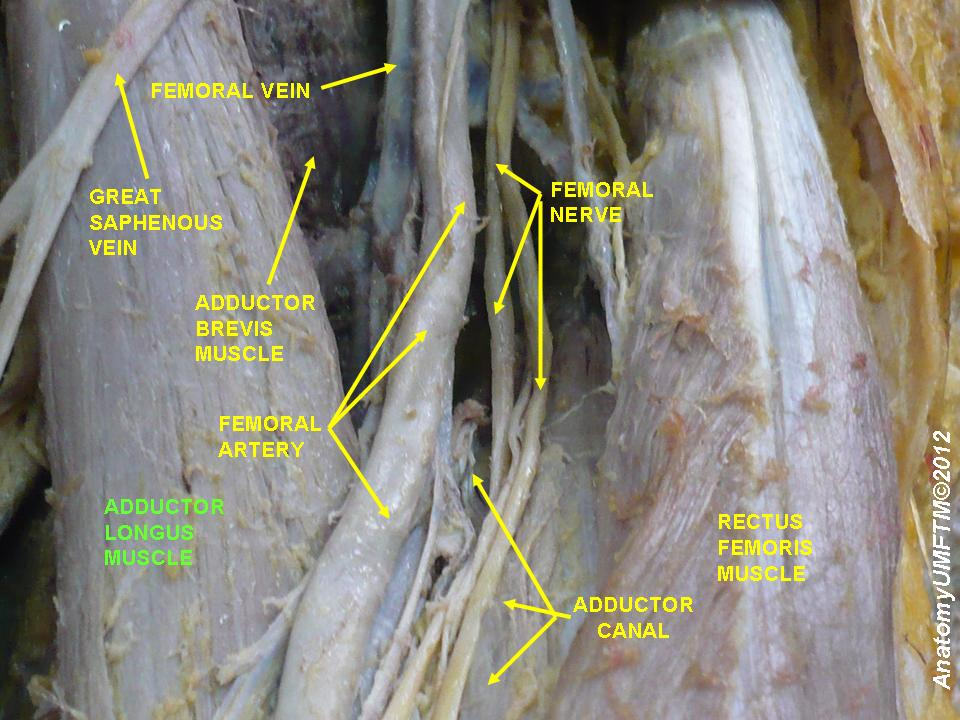
Adductor longus muscle

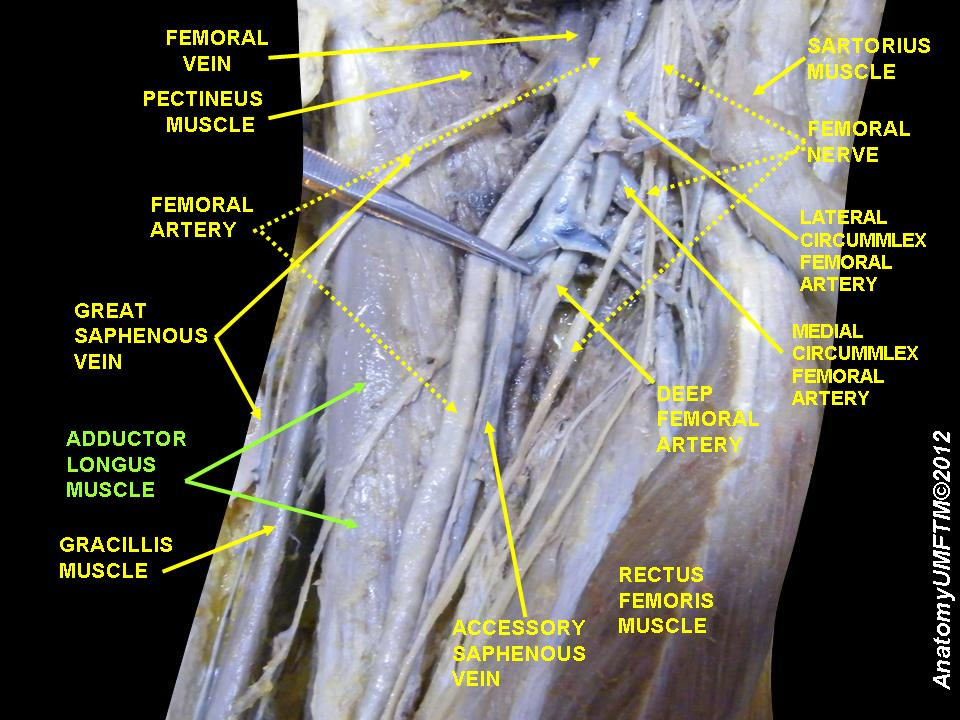
Adductor longus muscle

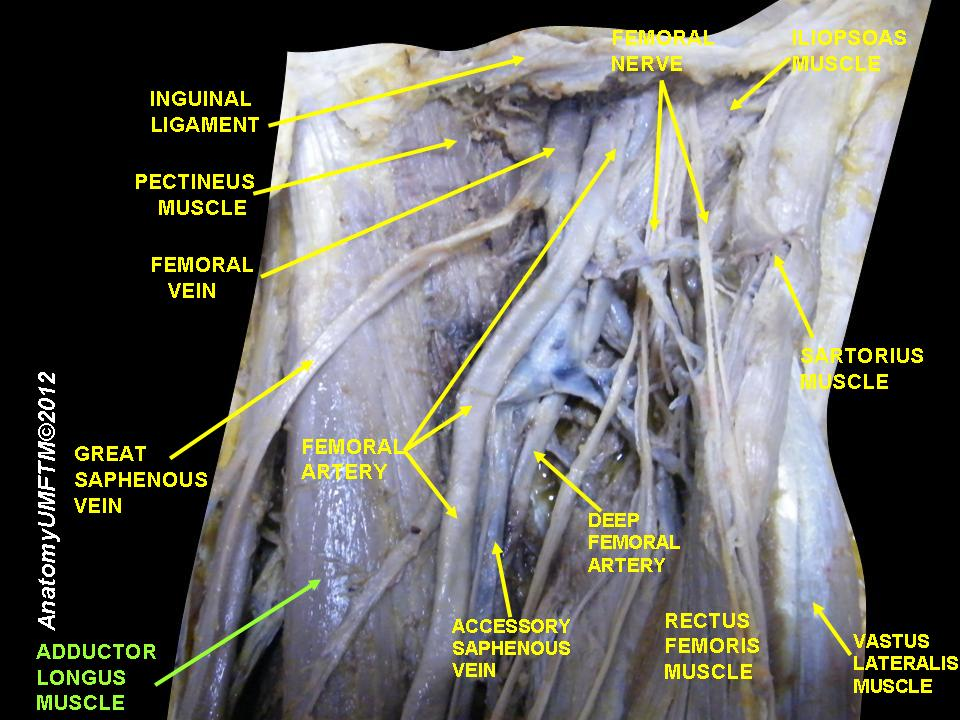
Adductor longus muscle

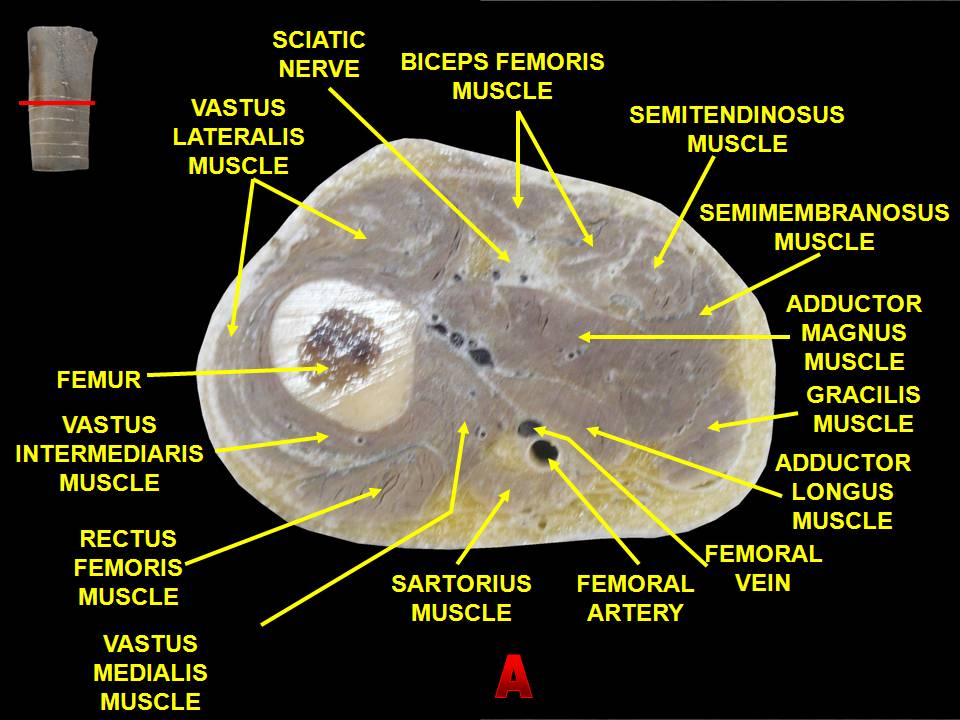
Muscles of thigh. Cross section.

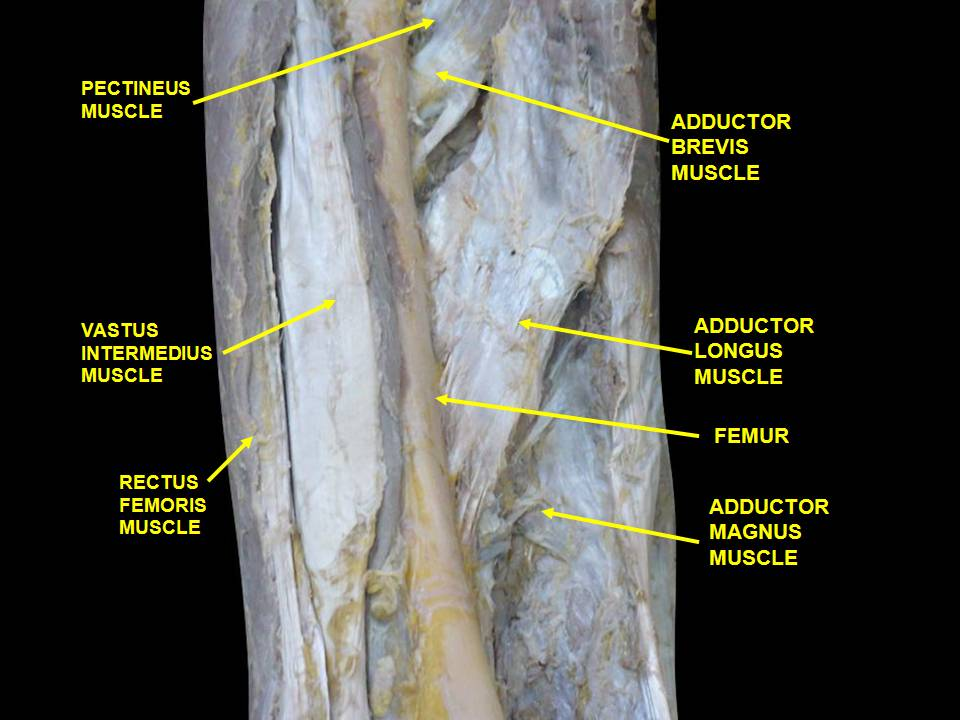
Muscles of thigh. Anterior views.
