= Adductor brevis muscle =

Muscle in the thigh situated immediately behind the pectineus and adductor longus

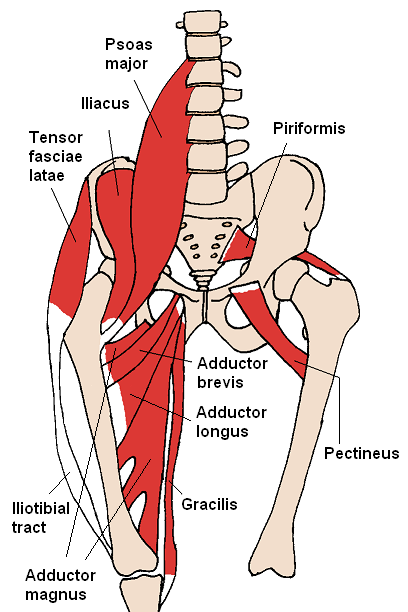
- The adductor brevis and nearby muscles

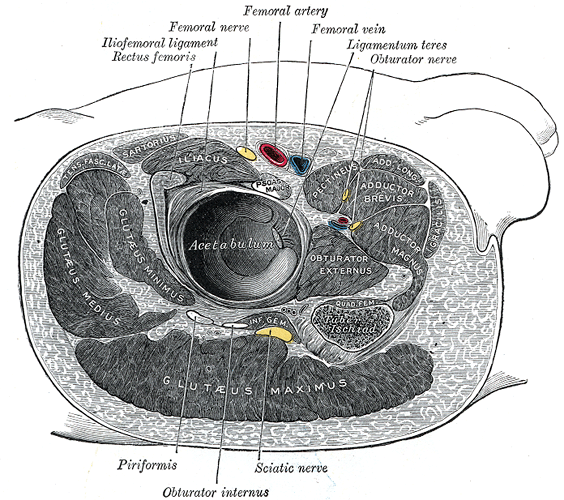
- Structures surrounding right hip-joint. (Adductor brevis at upper right.)

Details
- Origin: Anterior surface of the inferior ramus and body of the pubis
- Insertion: The lesser trochanter and linea aspera of the femur
- Artery: Deep femoral artery
- Nerve: Obturator nerve
- Actions: Adduction of hip

Identifiers
- Latin: musculus adductor brevis
- TA98: A04.7.02.027
- TA2: 2629
- FMA: 22442

The adductor brevis is a muscle in the thigh situated immediately deep to the pectineus and adductor longus. It belongs to the adductor muscle group. The main function of the adductor brevis is to pull the thigh medially. The adductor brevis and the rest of the adductor muscle group is also used to stabilize left to right movements of the trunk, when standing on both feet, or to balance when standing on a moving surface. The adductor muscle group is used pressing the thighs together to ride a horse, and kicking with the inside of the foot in soccer or swimming. Last, they contribute to flexion of the thigh when running or against resistance (squats, jumping, etc.).

== Structure ==
It is somewhat triangular in form, and arises by a narrow origin from the outer surfaces of the body of the pubis and inferior ramus of the pubis, between the gracilis and obturator externus.

The Adductor brevis muscle widens in triangular fashion to be inserted into the upper part of the linea aspera immediately lateral to the insertion of pectineus and above that of adductor longus.

=== Relations ===
By its anterior surface, the adductor brevis is in relation with the pectineus, adductor longus, and anterior branches of the obturator artery, the obturator vein, and the obturator nerve.

By its posterior surface with the adductor magnus and the posterior branches of the obturator artery, the obturator vein, and the obturator nerve.

By its outer border with the obturator externus, and the iliopsoas. By its inner border with the gracilis and adductor magnus.

It is pierced near its insertion by the middle perforating artery.

=== Innervation ===
The adductor brevis is innervated dually by the anterior and posterior branches of the obturator nerve.

== Function ==
The muscle is primarily known as a hip adductor. It also functions as a hip flexor. Whether it acts to rotate the femur laterally or medially is dependent on position.

== Additional images ==
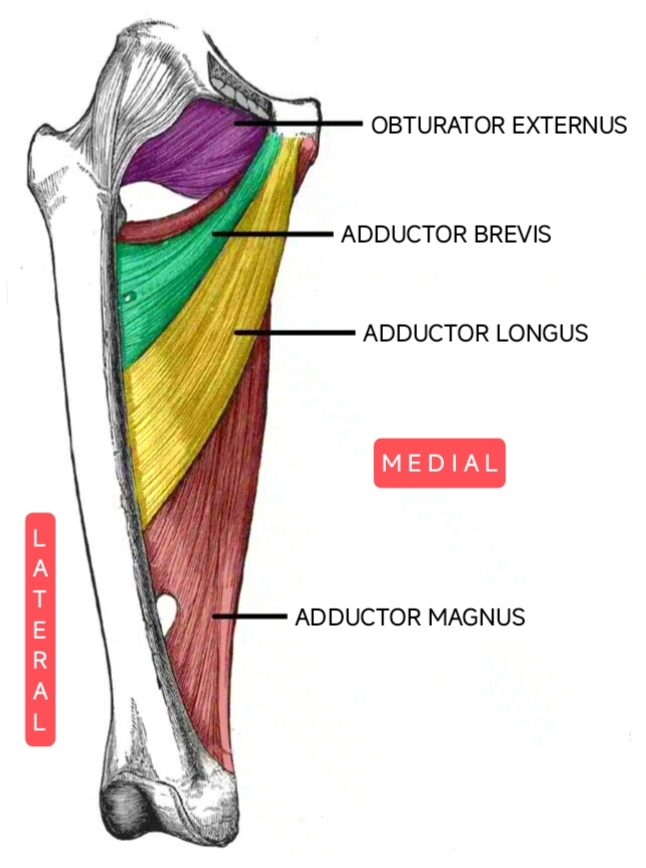
Deep muscles of the medial femoral region; right side, anterior view (After Gray.).
