= Fascial compartments of thigh =

Anatomical compartments

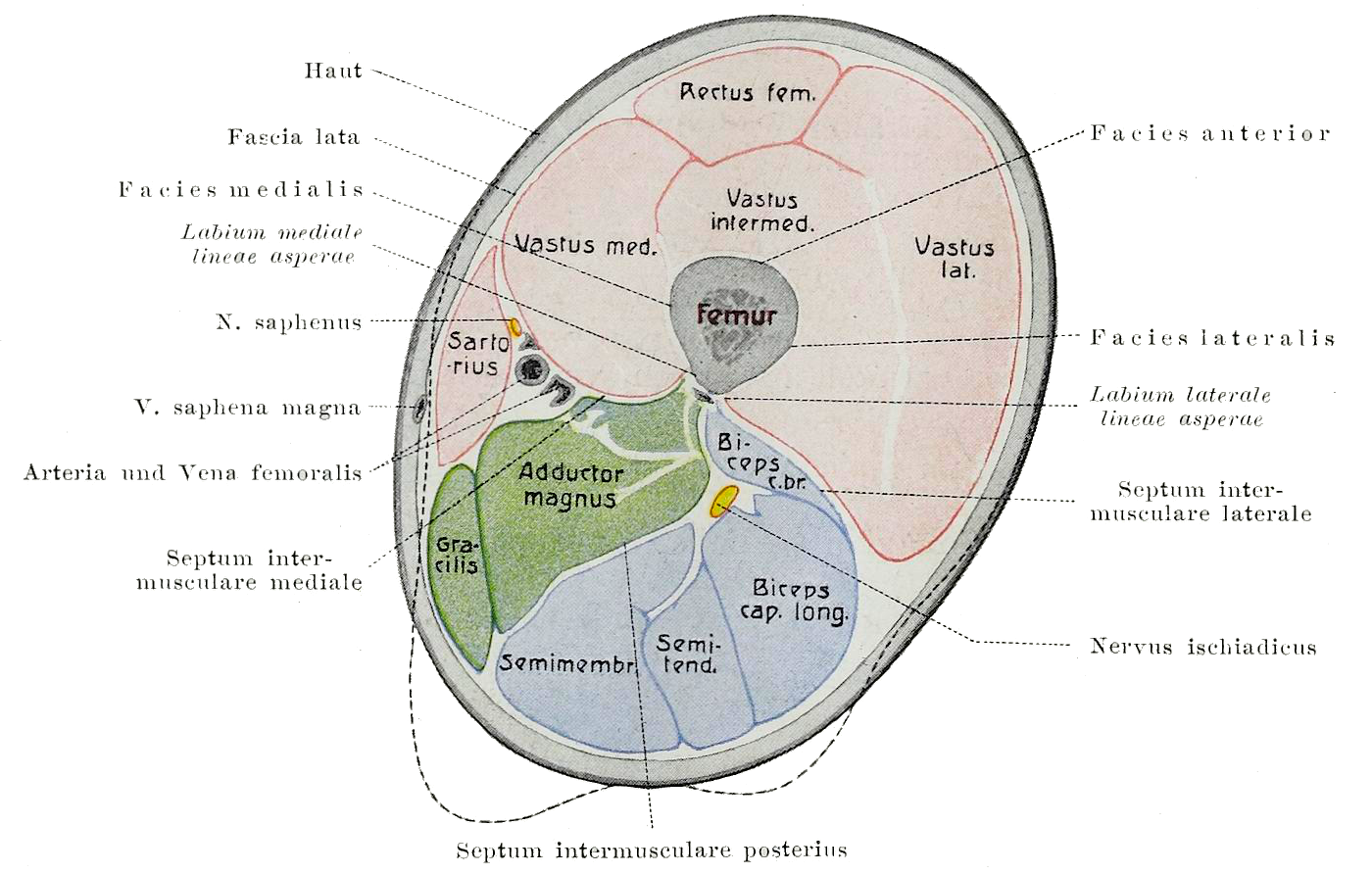
Cross section of the thigh showing the fascial compartments in different colors. Green is the medial compartment (gracilis and adductor magnus), blue is the posterior (semimembrosus to biceps c. brevis) and red is the anterior (vastus lateralis to sartorius).

The fascial compartments of thigh are the three fascial compartments that divide and contain the thigh muscles. The fascia lata is the strong and deep fascia of the thigh that surrounds the thigh muscles and forms the outer limits of the compartments. Internally the muscle compartments are divided by the lateral and medial intermuscular septa.

The three groups of muscles contained in the compartments have their own nerve supply:

== Compartments ==
| Compartment | Muscles | Neurovascular structures |
|---|---|---|
| Anterior compartment (front of the thigh) | Sartorius muscle, Quadriceps (Rectus femoris, Vastus lateralis, Vastus intermedius and Vastus medialis), Articularis genus | Femoral nerve |
| Medial compartment (inner thigh/groin) | Pectineus, External obturator, Gracilis muscle, Adductors (longus, brevis, and magnus) | Obturator nerve |
| Posterior compartment (back of the thigh) | 'hamstring portion' of the Adductor magnus, Biceps femoris, Semitendinosus and Semimembranosus | Sciatic nerve |

== See also ==
- Compartment syndrome
- Fascial compartments of arm
