= Superficial branch of medial circumflex femoral artery =

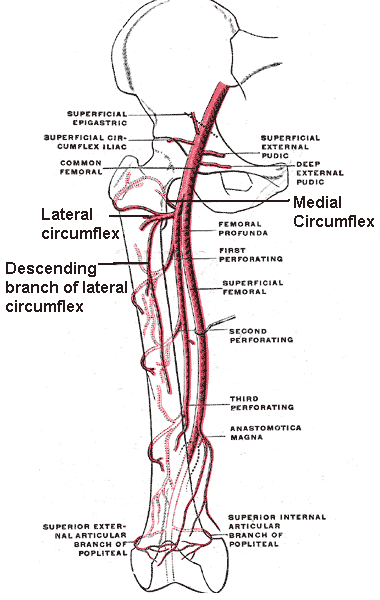
- The profunda femoris artery, femoral artery and their major branches - right thigh, anterior view. Circumflex femoral arteries labeled.

Details
- Source: Medial circumflex femoral artery

Identifiers
- Latin: ramus superficialis arteriae circumflexae femoris medialis
- TA98: A12.2.16.022
- TA2: 4687
- FMA: 20810

The superficial branch of medial circumflex femoral artery appears between the quadratus femoris and upper border of the adductor magnus, and anastomoses with the inferior gluteal artery, lateral femoral circumflex artery, and first of the perforating arteries of the deep femoral artery (crucial anastomosis).
