= Trochanteric anastomosis =

Circulatory system around the head of the femur

The trochanteric anastomosis is an anatomical structure that provides circulation around the head of the femur. It includes the superior gluteal artery and the medial and lateral circumflex femoral arteries (the former of which provides the main supply to the femur).

It is formed by the deep branch of superior gluteal artery, with ascending branches of both lateral and medial circumflex femoral arteries. The inferior gluteal artery usually joins the anastomosis.

Branches from the anastomosis passes along the femoral neck with the retinacular fibers of the capsule.

== See also ==
- Cruciate anastomosis
