= Posterior compartment of thigh =

One of the fascial compartments that contains the knee flexors and hip extensors

- Cross-section through the middle of the thigh. (Posterior compartment is at center bottom.)

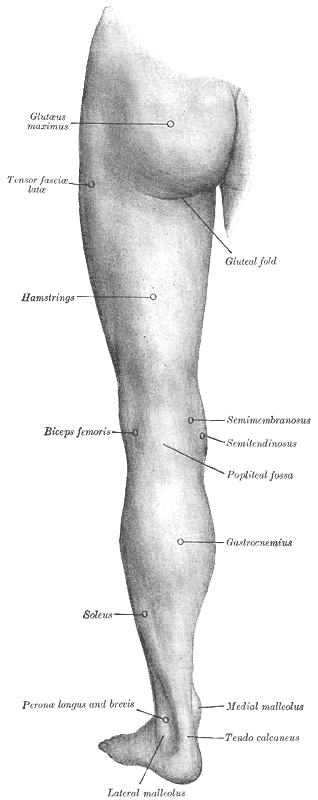
- Back of left lower extremity.

Details
- Artery: Inferior gluteal artery, profunda femoris artery, perforating arteries
- Nerve: Sciatic nerve

Identifiers
- Latin: compartimentum femoris posterius
- TA98: A04.7.01.003
- TA2: 2637
- FMA: 45157

The posterior compartment of the thigh is one of the fascial compartments that contains the knee flexors and hip extensors known as the hamstring muscles, as well as vascular and nervous elements, particularly the sciatic nerve.

== Structure ==
The posterior compartment is a fascial compartment bounded by fascia. It is separated from the anterior compartment by two folds of deep fascia, known as the medial intermuscular septum and the lateral intermuscular septum.

The muscles of the posterior compartment of the thigh are the:

- biceps femoris muscle, which consists of a short head and a long head.
- semitendinosus muscle
- semimembranosus muscle

These muscles (or their tendons) apart from the short head of the biceps femoris, are commonly known as the hamstrings. The depression at the back of the knee, or kneepit is the popliteal fossa, colloquially called the ham. The tendons of the above muscles can be felt as prominent cords on both sides of the fossa—the biceps femoris tendon on the lateral side and the semimembranosus and semitendinosus tendons on the medial side. The hamstrings flex the knee, and aided by the gluteus maximus, they extend the hip during walking and running. The semitendinosus is named for its unusually long tendon. The semimembranosus is named for the flat shape of its superior attachment.

=== Innervation ===
The hamstrings are innervated by the sciatic nerve, specifically by a main branch of it: the tibial nerve. (The short head of the biceps femoris is innervated by the common fibular nerve). The sciatic nerve runs along the longitudinal axis of the compartment, giving the cited terminal branches close to the superior angle of the popliteal fossa.

=== Blood supply ===
The arteries that supply the posterior compartment of the thigh arise from the inferior gluteal and the perforating branches of the profunda femoris artery, a major collateral branch of the femoral artery and part of the anterior compartment of thigh. The femoral artery itself crosses the adductor hiatus to enter the posterior compartment at the level of the popliteal fossa, giving branches that supply the knee. This crossing marks the point in which the vessel changes its name to popliteal artery.

== Clinical significance ==
As with any other fascial compartment, the posterior compartment of thigh can develop compartment syndrome when pressure builds up inside it, reducing the ability of arteries to transport blood to muscles and nerves. In acute cases, this is most frequently a consequence of trauma.

== See also ==
- Fascia lata
