= Cruciate anastomosis =

Artery connection in the upper thigh

- TA2: 4698

The cruciate anastomosis is a circulatory anastomosis in the upper thigh formed by the inferior gluteal artery, the lateral and medial circumflex femoral arteries, the first perforating artery of the deep femoral artery, and the anastomotic branch of the posterior branch of the obturator artery.

The cruciate anastomosis is clinically relevant because if there is a blockage between the femoral artery and external iliac artery, blood can reach the popliteal artery by means of the anastomosis. The route of blood is through the internal iliac, to the inferior gluteal artery, to a perforating branch of the deep femoral artery, to the lateral circumflex femoral artery, then to its descending branch into the superior lateral genicular artery and thus into the popliteal artery.

== Structure ==
The cruciate anastomosis is so-called because it resembles a cross.

Its four components are:

- Inferior gluteal artery
- Transverse branches of the lateral circumflex femoral artery and the medial circumflex femoral artery
- Ascending branch of the first perforating artery from the deep femoral artery

== See also ==
- Trochanteric anastomosis
