= Superior gluteal =

Superior gluteal can refer to:

- Superior gluteal artery
- Superior gluteal veins
- Superior gluteal nerve
