= Deep branch of medial circumflex femoral artery =

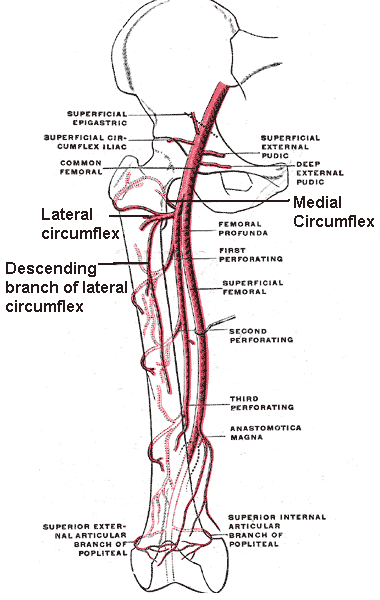
- The profunda femoris artery, femoral artery and their major branches - right thigh, anterior view. Circumflex femoral arteries labeled.

Details
- Source: Medial circumflex femoral artery

Identifiers
- Latin: ramus profundus arteriae circumflexae femoris medialis
- TA98: A12.2.16.023
- TA2: 4688
- FMA: 22417

The deep branch runs obliquely upward upon the tendon of the obturator externus and in front of the quadratus femoris toward the trochanteric fossa, where it anastomoses with twigs from the superior gluteal artery and inferior gluteal artery. It primarily supplies blood to the posterior hip joint capsule and the adjacent musculature, and contributes to the trochanteric anastomosis.
