= Femoral circumflex artery =

Femoral circumflex artery may refer to:

- Medial circumflex femoral artery
- Lateral circumflex femoral artery
