= Acetabular branch of medial circumflex femoral artery =

Artery in the hip

Acetabular branch
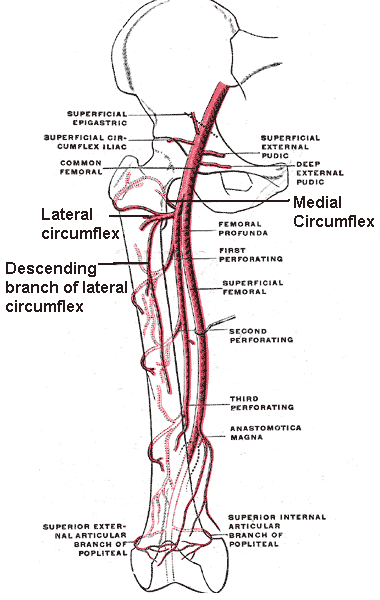
- The profunda femoris artery, femoral artery and their major branches - right thigh, frontal view (circumflex femoral arteries labeled)

Details
- Source: Medial circumflex femoral artery

Identifiers
- Latin: ramus acetabularis arteriae circumflexae femoris medialis
- TA98: A12.2.16.024; A12.2.15.010
- TA2: 4689
- FMA: 20813

The acetabular branch is an artery in the hip that arises from the medial circumflex femoral artery opposite the acetabular notch and enters the hip-joint beneath the transverse ligament in company with an articular branch from the obturator artery. It supplies the fat in the bottom of the acetabulum, and is continued along the ligament to the head of the femur.
