= Intermuscular septum of thigh =

Intermuscular septum of thigh may refer to:

- Lateral intermuscular septum of thigh
- Medial intermuscular septum of thigh
