= Fascia lata =

Deep fascia of the thigh

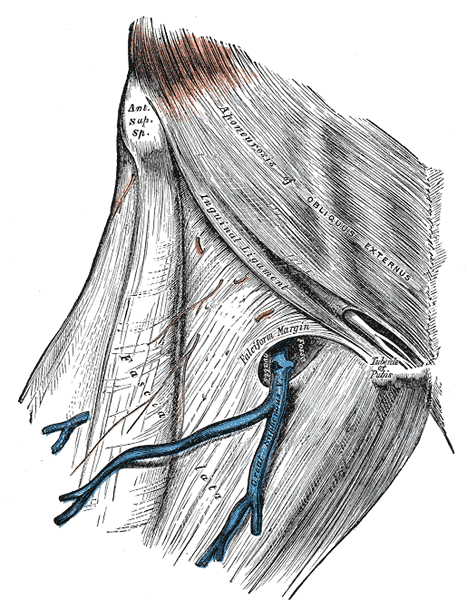
- The fossa ovalis. (Fascia lata labeled at bottom left.)

- Iliotibial tract.

Details

Identifiers
- Latin: fascia lata
- MeSH: D005206
- TA98: A04.7.03.002
- TA2: 2689
- FMA: 13902

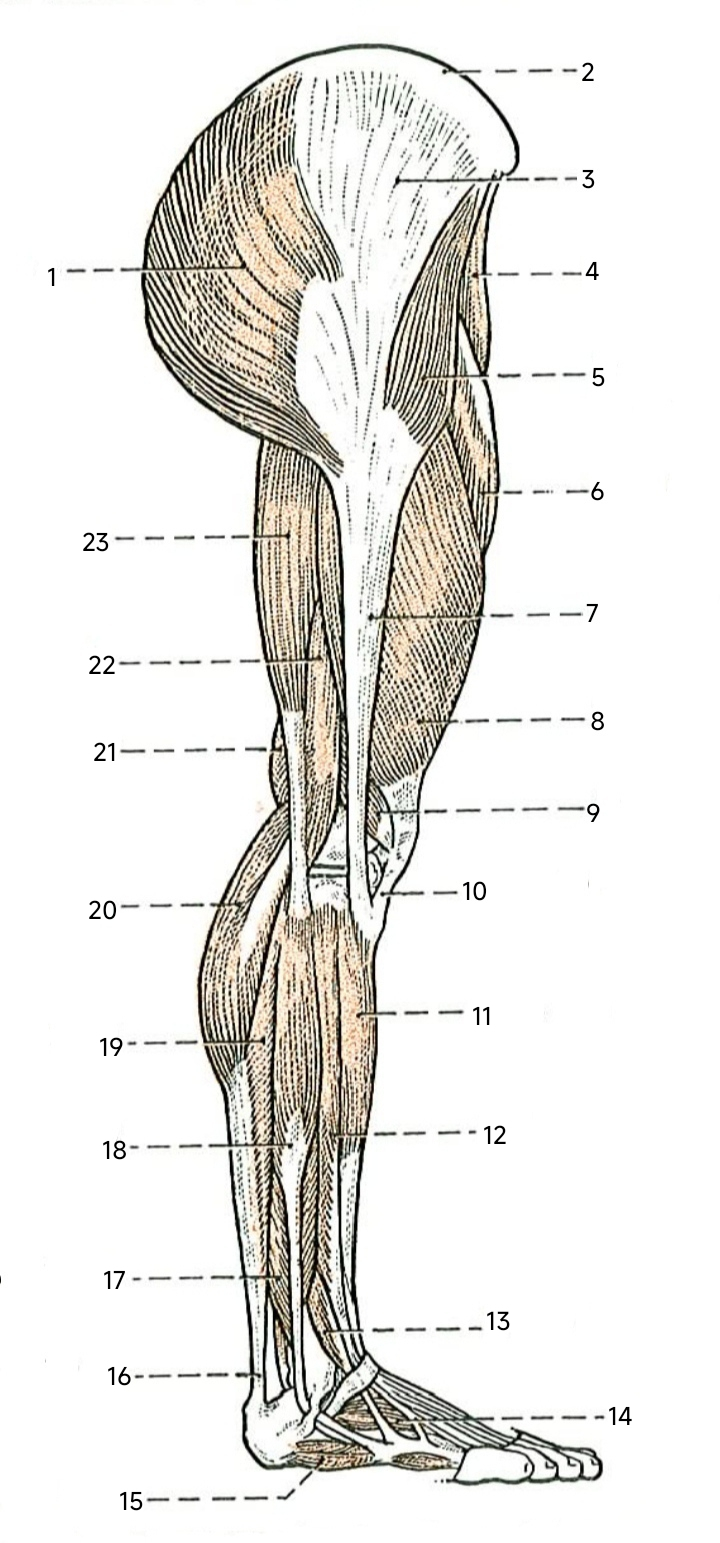
Muscles of the lower limb; right side, lateral view. The fascia lata is labeled 3. The tensor fasciae latae is labeled 5. (After Charpy.)

The fascia lata is the deep fascia of the thigh. It encloses the thigh muscles and forms the outer limit of the fascial compartments of thigh, which are internally separated by the medial intermuscular septum and the lateral intermuscular septum. The fascia lata is thickened at its lateral side where it forms the iliotibial tract, a structure that runs to the tibia and serves as a site of muscle attachment.

== Structure ==
The fascia lata is an investment for the whole of the thigh, but varies in thickness in different parts. It is thicker in the upper and lateral part of the thigh, where it receives a fibrous expansion from the gluteus maximus, and where the tensor fasciae latae is inserted between its layers; it is very thin behind and at the upper and medial part, where it covers the adductor muscles, and again becomes stronger around the knee, receiving fibrous expansions from the tendon of the biceps femoris laterally, from the sartorius medially, and from the quadriceps femoris in front.

=== Function ===
The fascia lata surrounds the tensor fasciae latae muscle. It is a fibrous sheath that encircles the thigh subcutaneously. This encircling of the muscle allows the muscles to be bound together tightly.

=== Above and behind ===
The fascia lata is attached, above and behind (i.e. proximal and posterior), to the back of the sacrum and coccyx; laterally, to the iliac crest; in front, to the inguinal ligament, and to the superior ramus of the pubis; and medially, to the inferior ramus of the pubis, to the inferior ramus and tuberosity of the ischium, and to the lower border of the sacrotuberous ligament.

From its attachment to the iliac crest it passes down over the gluteus medius to the upper border of the gluteus maximus, where it splits into two layers, one passing superficial to and the other beneath this muscle; at the lower border of the muscle the two layers reunite.

=== Laterally ===
Laterally, the fascia lata receives the greater part of the tendon of insertion of the gluteus maximus, and becomes proportionately thickened.

The portion of the fascia lata attached to the front part of the iliac crest, and corresponding to the origin of the tensor fasciae latae, extends down the lateral side of the thigh as two layers, one superficial to and the other beneath this muscle; at the lower end of the muscle these two layers unite and form a strong band, having first received the insertion of the muscle.

This band is continued downward under the name of the iliotibial band and is attached to the lateral condyle of the tibia.

The part of the iliotibial band which lies beneath the tensor fasciae latae is prolonged upward to join the lateral part of the capsule of the hip joint.

=== Below ===
Below, the fascia lata is attached to all the prominent points around the knee joint, viz., the condyles of the femur and tibia, and the head of the fibula.

On either side of the kneecap it is strengthened by transverse fibers from the lower parts of the vasti muscles (three of the four quadriceps) which are attached to and support this bone.

Of these the lateral are the stronger, and are continuous with the iliotibial band.

The deep surface of the fascia lata gives off two strong intermuscular septa, which are attached to the whole length of the linea aspera and its prolongations above and below; the lateral intermuscular septum, the stronger of the two, extends from the insertion of the gluteus maximus to the lateral condyle, separates the vastus lateralis in front from the short head of the biceps femoris behind, and gives partial origin to these muscles; the medial intermuscular septum is the thinner one and separates the vastus medialis from the adductor muscles.

Besides these there are numerous smaller septa, separating the individual muscles, and enclosing each in a distinct sheath.

=== Deep fascia of leg ===
The deep fascia of the lower leg is a continuation of the fascia lata.

== Clinical significance ==
=== Transplantation ===
Since the 1920s fasciae latae from deceased donors have been used in reconstructive surgery. In 1999 preserved mashed fasciae latae became FDA-approved as a tissue product designed to replace areas of lost fascia or collagen. The fascia lata normally performs the function of encircling and tightening the muscles in the thigh. Because of this function, it has been used as grafts for patients with facial paralysis. The fascia lata offers supports to the muscles that make up the face and this support increases the recovery of the facial muscles. The surgeons use the fascia lata as a sort of facial sling to support up the paralyzed face and loops the fascia lata around the center of the lower lip, the corner of the mouth and the center of the upper lip. A small portion of fascia lata harvested through a sub centimeter skin incision on the lower lateral side of the thigh is used for reconstructing the ear drum in tympanoplasty surgery. A larger portion is used in nasal endoscopic skull base surgery.

== History ==
=== Etymology ===
It is named from its great extent. "Latus" give the superlative "Latissimus" meaning broadest or widest.

== Additional images ==
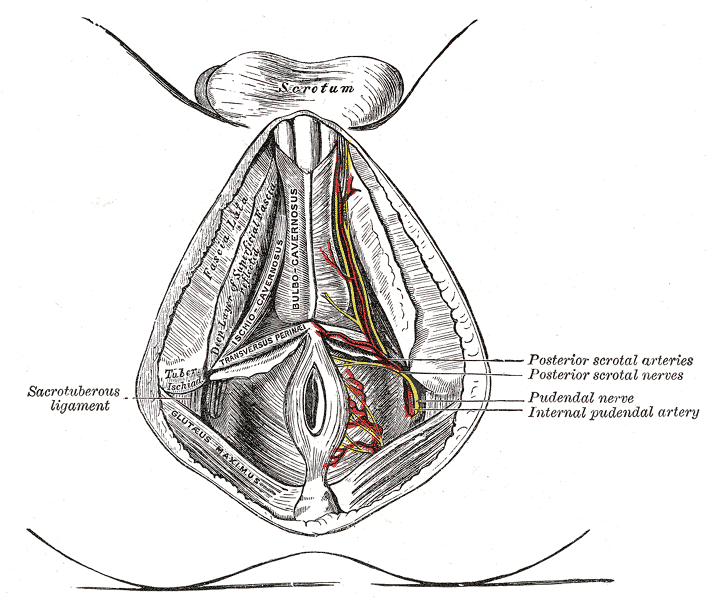
The superficial branches of the internal pudendal artery.

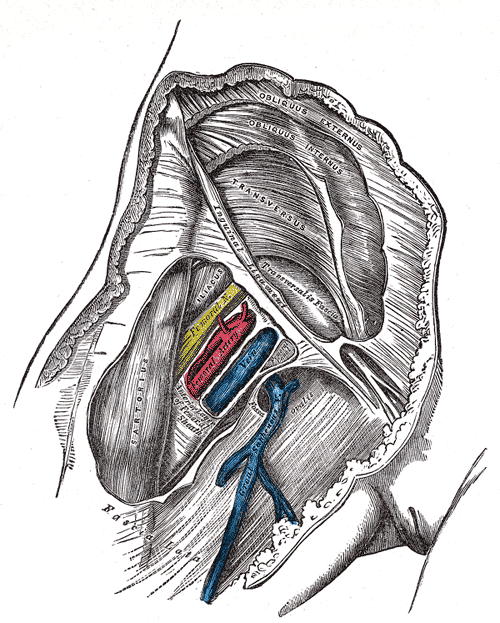
Femoral sheath laid open to show its three compartments.
