= Circumflex femoral artery =

Circumflex femoral artery may refer to:

- Lateral circumflex femoral artery, an artery in the upper thigh
- Medial circumflex femoral artery, an artery in the upper thigh that helps supply blood to the neck of the femur
