= Ascending branch of circumflex femoral artery =

Ascending branch of circumflex femoral artery can refer to:

- Ascending branch of lateral circumflex femoral artery (ramus ascendens arteriae circumflexae femoris lateralis)
- Ascending branch of medial circumflex femoral artery (ramus ascendens arteriae circumflexae femoris medialis)
