= Ascending branch of medial circumflex femoral artery =

Small artery in the thigh

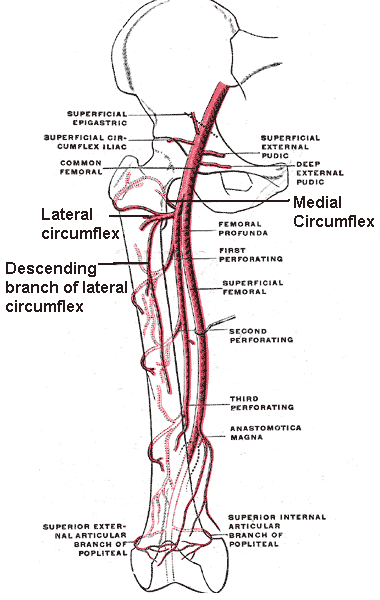
- The profunda femoris artery, femoral artery and their major branches - right thigh, front view (circumflex femoral arteries labeled)

Details
- Source: Medial circumflex femoral artery

Identifiers
- Latin: ramus ascendens arteriae circumflexae femoris medialis
- TA98: A12.2.16.025
- TA2: 4690
- FMA: 20811

The ascending branch of medial circumflex femoral artery is a small artery in the thigh. It branches of the medial circumflex femoral artery and is distributed to the adductor muscles of the hip. It anastomoses with the obturator artery.

It also serves as an important blood supply to the head of the femur.
