= Medial intermuscular septum =

Medial intermuscular septum can refer to:

- medial intermuscular septum of arm
- medial intermuscular septum of thigh
