= Lateral intermuscular septum =

Lateral intermuscular septum may refer to:

- lateral intermuscular septum of arm
- lateral intermuscular septum of thigh
