= Superficial branch =

Superficial branch may refer to:

- Superficial branch of ulnar nerve
- Superficial branch of radial nerve
- Superficial branch of lateral plantar nerve
- Superficial palmar branch of radial artery
- Superficial branch of medial circumflex femoral artery
- Superficial branch of transverse cervical artery
