= Accompanying artery of ischiadic nerve =

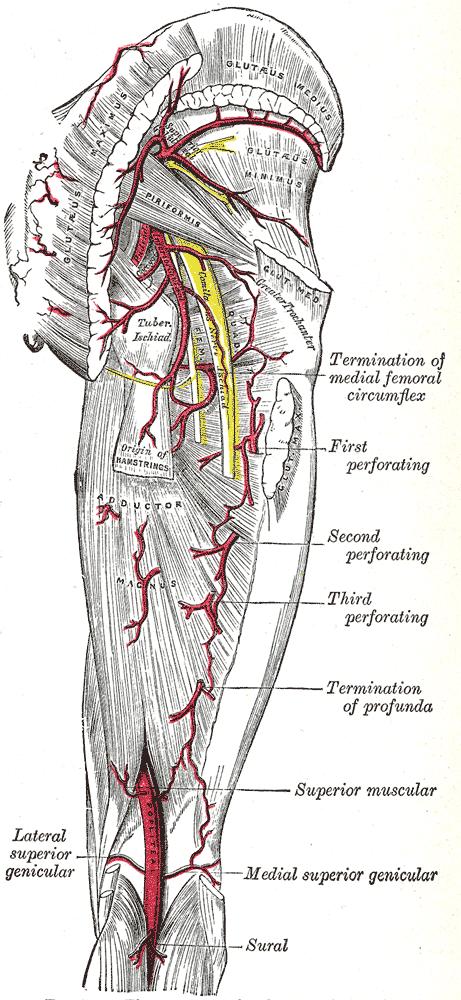
- The arteries of the gluteal and posterior femoral regions (comitans nervi ischiadici labeled near center)

Details
- Source: Inferior gluteal artery

Identifiers
- Latin: arteria comitans nervi ischiadici
- FMA: 77444

The accompanying artery of ischiadic nerve is a long, slender artery in the thigh. It branches off the inferior gluteal artery. It accompanies the sciatic nerve for a short distance. It then penetrates it, and runs in its substance to the lower part of the thigh.
