= Anastomosis =

Connection or opening between two things

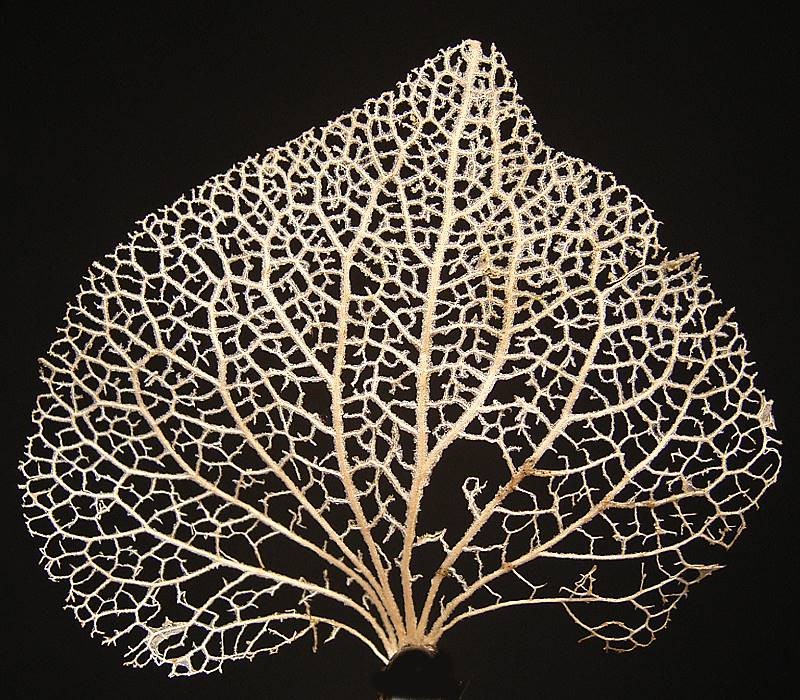
Vein skeleton of a Hydrangea leaf showing anastomoses of veins

An anastomosis (/əˌnæstəˈmoʊsɪs/, pl. anastomoses) is a connection or opening between two things (especially cavities or passages) that are normally diverging or branching, such as between blood vessels, leaf veins, or streams. Such a connection may be normal (such as the foramen ovale in a fetus' heart) or abnormal (such as the patent foramen ovale in an adult's heart); it may be acquired (such as an arteriovenous fistula) or innate (such as the arteriovenous shunt of a metarteriole); and it may be natural (such as the aforementioned examples) or artificial (such as a surgical anastomosis). The reestablishment of an anastomosis that had become blocked is called a reanastomosis. Anastomoses that are abnormal, whether congenital or acquired, are often called fistulas.

The term is used in medicine, biology, mycology, cybernetics, as well as geology, and geography.

== Etymology ==
Anastomosis: medical or Modern Latin, from Greek ἀναστόμωσις, anastomosis, "outlet, opening", Greek ana- "up, on, upon", stoma "mouth", "to furnish with a mouth". Thus the -stom- syllable is cognate with that of stoma in botany or stoma in medicine.

== Medical anatomy ==
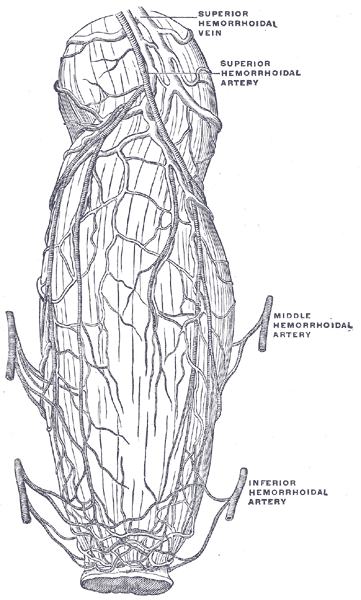
A network of blood vessels

An anastomosis is the connection of two normally divergent structures. It refers to connections between blood vessels or between other tubular structures such as loops of intestine.

=== Circulatory ===
In circulatory anastomoses, many arteries naturally anastomose with each other; for example, the inferior epigastric artery and superior epigastric artery, or the anterior and/or posterior communicating arteries in the Circle of Willis in the brain. Circulatory anastomoses can be further divided into anastomoses between arteries (arterio-arterial), between veins (veno-venous), and between an artery and a vein (arterio-venous).

Arterio-arterial anastomoses have two sub-types: actual, where the arteries meet end to end (e.g., palmar arch, plantar arch); and potential, where arteries meet at terminal arterioles (e.g. coronary arteries and cortical branch of cerebral arteries).

When a tissue or organ has multiple pathways for blood supply, this is a result of arterio-arterial anastomoses forming alternative routes, thus helping regulate systemic blood flow.

Joints receive blood through arterio-arterial anastomoses, with most having more than one anastomotic source. Major examples of arterio-arterial anastomoses providing blood to joints include the shoulder (scapular), elbow (cubital), hip (trochanteric and cruciate anastomoses), knee (patellar), and ankle (malleolar).

Arterio-venous anastomoses are found throughout the body, particularly in the hands and feet, and play an important role in temperature regulation. When the body reaches a high temperature, these veins open up to allow warm arterial blood to pass closer to the skin, bringing the heat to the surface and overall decreasing the body's temperature.

=== Surgical ===
Surgical anastomosis occurs when segments of intestine, blood vessel, or any other structure are connected together surgically (anastomosed). Examples include arterial anastomosis in bypass surgery, intestinal anastomosis after a piece of intestine has been resected, Roux-en-Y anastomosis and ureteroureterostomy. Surgical anastomosis techniques include linear stapled anastomosis, hand sewn anastomosis, end-to-end anastomosis (EEA). Anastomosis can be performed by hand or with an anastomosis assist device. Studies have been performed comparing various anastomosis approaches taking into account surgical "time and cost, postoperative anastomotic bleeding, leakage, and stricture".

Anastomotic leakage (AL) in colorectal cancer surgery

Failure of an intestinal anastomosis with leakage of intestinal content into the abdominal cavity is one of the most severe complications after bowel surgery. The severity of anastomotic leakage varies ranging from mild with minimal impact on the patient, to severe and potentially fatal with negative impact on both short- and long-term outcomes. The incidence has not changed in recent decades, despite improvement in surgical techniques, prehabilitation and perioperative care. Anastomotic leakage after rectal cancer surgery is higher and documented to occur in 9–11% of patients; after colon resection the incidence of leakage is lower at about 6%. Systemic factors contributing to anastomotic failure include sepsis, anemia, diabetes mellitus, previous irradiation, malnutrition, steroid use, smoking, heavy alcohol consumption, obesity and certain disease conditions like Crohn's disease.

Signs of an anastomotic leak include fever, abdominal pain or peritonitis, leukocytosis and tachycardia or new-onset arrhythmias. Anastomotic leakage is usually diagnosed 5–8 days post-surgery. A CT scan with pneumoperitoneum and significant free fluid or inflammatory changes around the anastomosis are suggestive of an anastomotic failure. Depending on the magnitude of the defect and leak different treatments are indicated. A localized anastomotic leak without systemic sepsis or peritonitis can be managed with antibiotics and if possible, drainage of the abscess. Anastomotic leaks associated with peritonitis or systemic sepsis requires an operation with either revision of the anastomosis if feasible or fecal diversion proximally or at the site of the anastomosis with a stoma.

The exact cause of anastomotic leakage remains unclear, but impaired blood supply at the anastomotic site and bacterial activity in the gut have been shown to be associated with its development. Gut microbiota, in particular, Enterococcus faecalis and Pseudomonas aeruginosa, has been shown to degrade collagen at the suture site due to high collaganase activity, therefore contributing to the development of the leakage. Patient-related factors, especially diabetes and visceral obesity, remain important independent predictors of anastomotic leakage.

=== Pathological ===
Pathological anastomoses results from trauma or disease and may involve veins, arteries, or intestines; these are usually referred to as fistulas. In the cases of veins or arteries, traumatic fistulas usually occur between artery and vein. Traumatic intestinal fistulas usually occur between two loops of intestine (entero-enteric fistula) or intestine and skin (enterocutaneous fistula). Portacaval anastomosis, by contrast, is an anastomosis between a vein of the portal circulation and a vein of the systemic circulation, which allows blood to bypass the liver in patients with portal hypertension, often resulting in hemorrhoids, esophageal varices, or caput medusae.

== Biology ==
=== Evolution ===
In evolution, anastomosis is a recombination of evolutionary lineage. Conventional accounts of evolutionary lineage present themselves as the branching out of species into novel forms. Under anastomosis, species might recombine after initial branching out, such as in the case of recent research that shows that ancestral populations along human and chimpanzee lineages may have interbred after an initial branching event. The concept of anastomosis also applies to the theory of symbiogenesis, in which new species emerge from the formation of novel symbiotic relationships.

=== Mycology ===
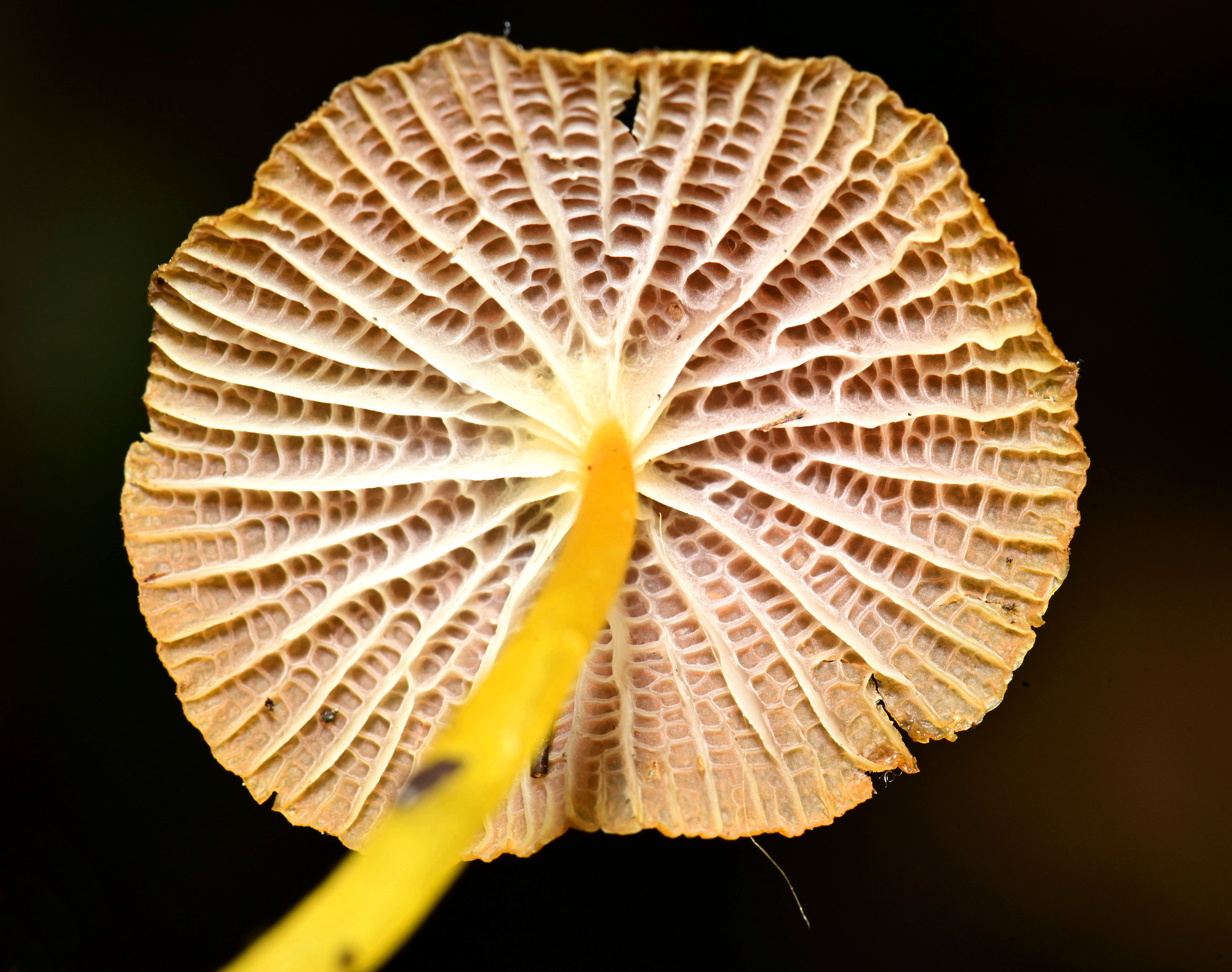
Anastomosing gills of Marasmius cf. cladophyllus

In mycology, anastomosis is the fusion between branches of the same or different hyphae. Hence the bifurcating fungal hyphae can form true reticulating networks. By sharing materials in the form of dissolved ions, hormones, and nucleotides, the fungus maintains bidirectional communication with itself. The fungal network might begin from several origins; several spores (i.e. by means of conidial anastomosis tubes), several points of penetration, each a spreading circumference of absorption and assimilation. Once encountering the tip of another expanding, exploring self, the tips press against each other in pheromonal recognition or by an unknown recognition system, fusing to form a genetic singular clonal colony that can cover hectares called a genet or just microscopical areas.

For fungi, anastomosis is also a component of reproduction. In some fungi, two different haploid mating types – if compatible – merge. Somatically, they form a morphologically similar mycelial wave front that continues to grow and explore. The significant difference is that each septated unit is binucleate, containing two unfused nuclei, i.e. one from each parent that eventually undergoes karyogamy and meiosis to complete the sexual cycle.

Also the term "anastomosing" is used for mushroom gills which interlink and separate to form a network.

=== Botany ===
The growth of a strangler fig around a host tree, with tendrils fusing together to form a mesh, is called anastomosing.

== Cybernetics ==
=== Anastomotic reticulum ===
In management cybernetics, Stafford Beer used the term "anastomotic reticulum" to refer to a particular type of tangled network of connections between inputs and outputs, such that it is difficult to trace the flow of messages through the network.^{:30–33} Due to the complexity involved, the internal operation of such a structure is difficult to analyze and describe, and so the whole network should instead be viewed as a black box. According to Beer, viable systems reveal many such networks, and are therefore best understood in these terms.^{:66–67}

== Geosciences ==
=== Geology ===
In geology, anastomosis is used for multiple meanings:

- Veins of quartz or other minerals can display anastomosis.
- Ductile shear zones frequently show anastomosing geometries of highly-strained rocks around lozenges of less-deformed material.
- Molten lava flows sometimes flow in anastomosed lava channels or lava tubes.
- In cave systems, anastomosis is the splitting of cave passages that later reconnect.

=== Geography and hydrology ===
Anastomosing rivers, or anastomosing streams, consist of multiple channels that divide and reconnect and are separated by semi-permanent banks formed of cohesive material, such that they are unlikely to migrate from one channel position to another. They can be confused with braided rivers based on their planforms alone, but braided rivers are much shallower and more dynamic than anastomosing rivers. Some definitions require that an anastomosing river be made up of interconnected channels that enclose flood basins, again in contrast with braided rivers.

Rivers with anastomosed reaches include the Magdalena River in Colombia, the upper Columbia River in British Columbia, Canada, the Drumheller Channels of the Channeled Scablands of the state of Washington, US, the Furos de Breves in the Brazilian Amazon Delta, and the upper Narew River in Poland. The term anabranch has been used for segments of anastomosing rivers.

Braided streams show anastomosing channels around channel bars of alluvium.
