= Anterior compartment of thigh =

Muscles which extend the knee and flex the hip

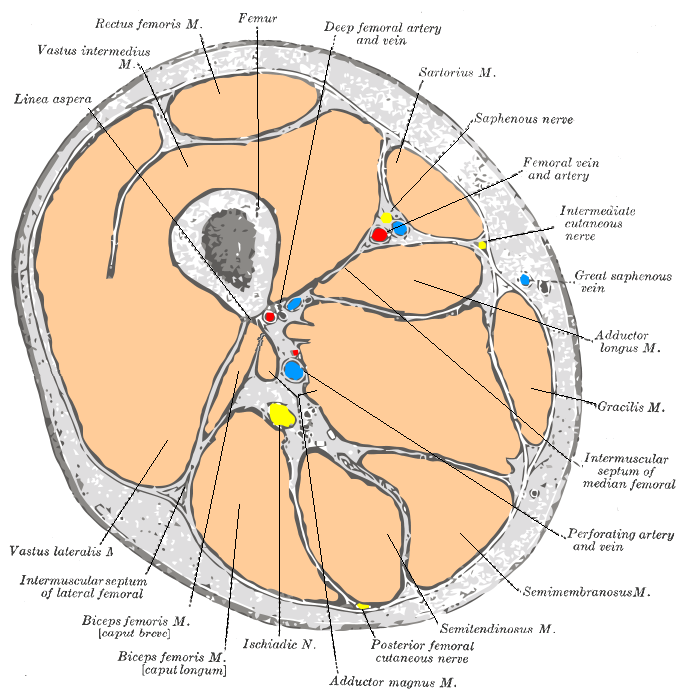
- Cross-section through the middle of the thigh. (Anterior compartment is at upper left, from the 7 o'clock position to the 2 o'clock position)

Details
- Artery: Femoral artery
- Nerve: Femoral nerve

Identifiers
- Latin: compartimentum femoris anterius
- TA98: A04.7.01.002
- TA2: 2609
- FMA: 45151

The anterior compartment of thigh contains muscles which extend the knee and flex the hip.

== Structure ==
The anterior compartment is one of the fascial compartments of the thigh that contains groups of muscles together with their nerves and blood supply. The anterior compartment contains the sartorius muscle (the longest muscle in the body) and the quadriceps femoris group, which consists of the rectus femoris muscle and the three vasti muscles – the vastus lateralis, vastus intermedius, and the vastus medialis.

The iliopsoas is sometimes considered a member of the anterior compartment muscles, as is the articularis genus muscle.

The anterior compartment is separated from the posterior compartment by the lateral intermuscular septum and from the medial compartment by the medial intermuscular septum.

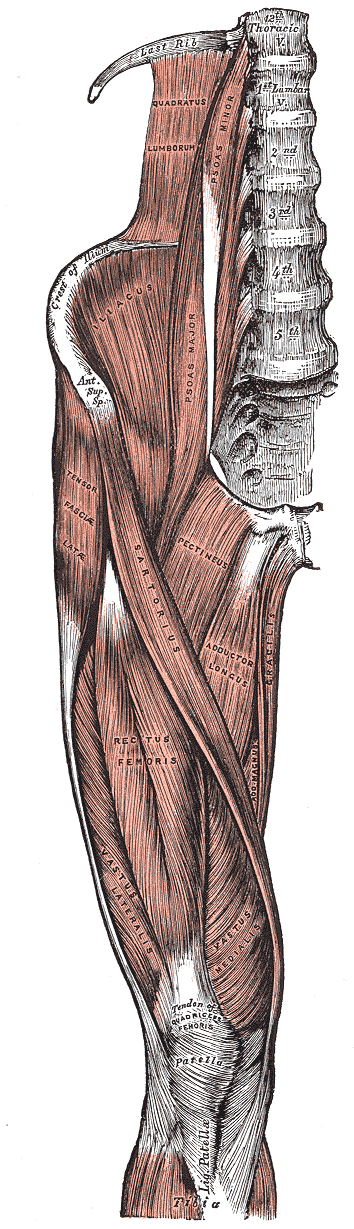
Anterior aspect of right leg.

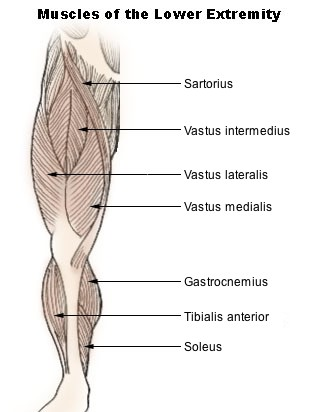
Muscles of leg

=== Nerve supply ===
The nerve of the anterior compartment of thigh is the femoral nerve. Innervation for the quadriceps muscles come from the posterior division of the femoral nerve, while the anterior division (which contains cutaneous as well as muscular components) gives a lateral and a medial branch, the second being responsible for the innervation of the sartorius muscle. The iliacus and the psoas major and psoas minor muscles, sometimes considered part of the anterior compartment, do not share the same innervation. Whereas the iliacus is innervated by the femoral nerve, the psoas is innervated by ventral rami of L1-L3.

=== Blood supply ===
When the external iliac artery crosses the inguinal ligament, it becomes the femoral artery, which supplies blood to the anterior compartment and is the largest blood vessel of the inferior member.

== Function ==
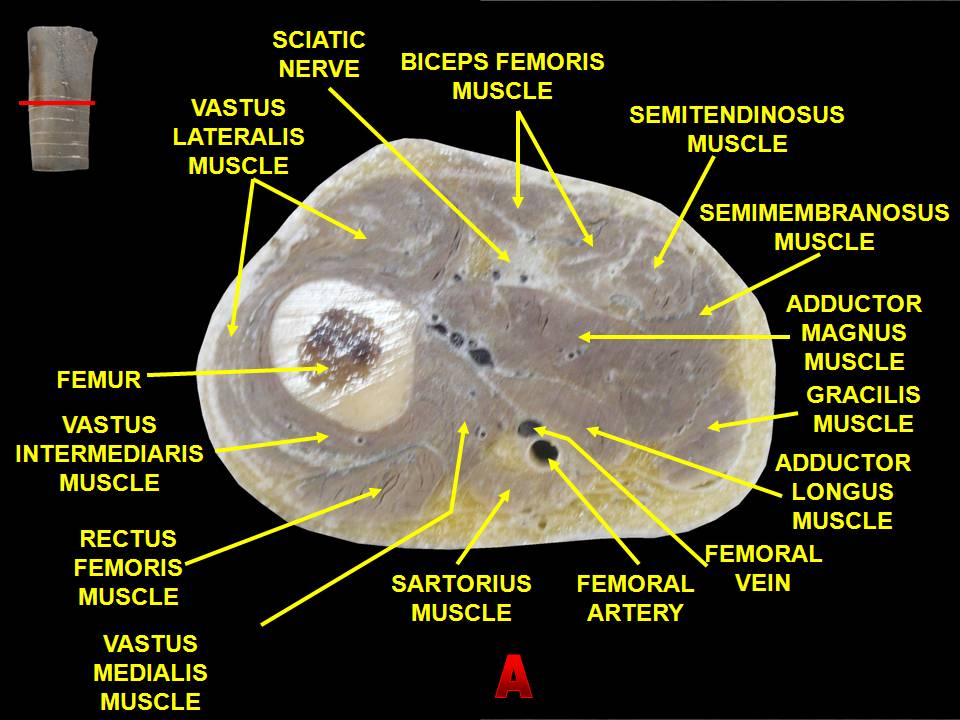
Cross-section of the upper right thigh. In this diagram, the anterior surface is at the bottom (labelled "A"). The anterior compartment is separated by a fibrous septum which is visible from the femoral artery and vein at the bottom, surrounding the sartorius muscle, and travelling to the profunda femoris artery adjacent to the femur (not labelled), from here to the sciatic nerve, and then between the vastus lateralis and biceps femoris muscles. The compartments on the left-hand side of the image are contained within the compartment.

The anterior compartment of thigh contains muscles which are extensors of the knee and flexors of the hip joints.

== Clinical significance ==
The anterior compartment may be affected as part of a compartment syndrome.
