= Superior gluteal veins =

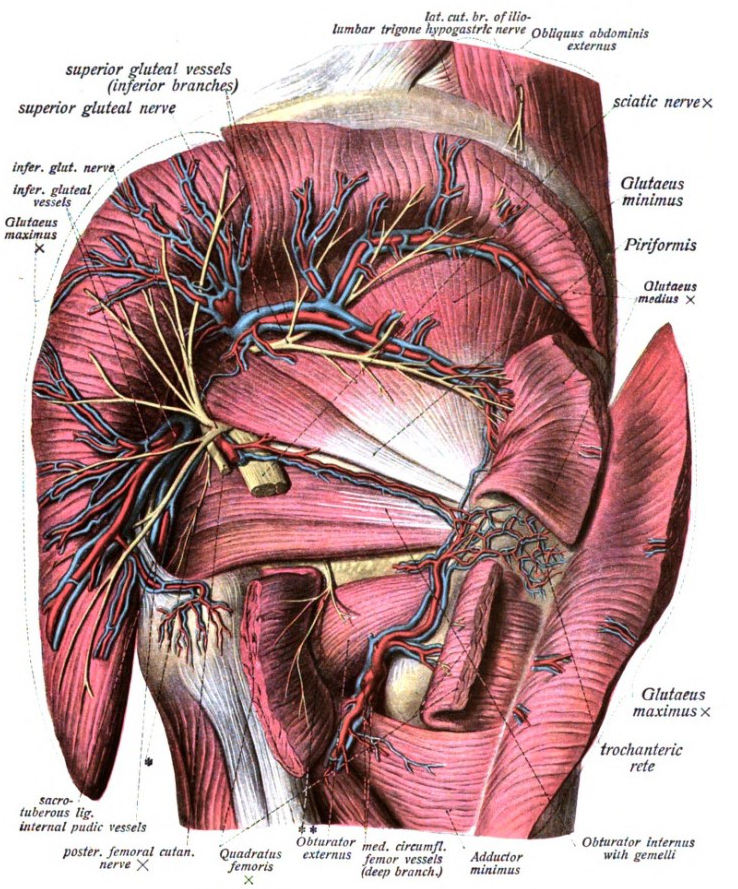
- Vessels and nerves of gluteal region.

Details
- Drains to: Posterior division of internal iliac vein
- Artery: Superior gluteal artery

Identifiers
- Latin: venae glutaeae superiores
- TA98: A12.3.10.005
- TA2: 5025
- FMA: 70907

The superior gluteal veins (gluteal veins) are venæ comitantes of the superior gluteal artery. They receive tributaries from the buttock corresponding with the branches of the artery. They enter the pelvis through the greater sciatic foramen, superior to the piriformis. They drain into internal iliac vein (often uniting to drain as a single trunk).
