= Superior gluteal artery =

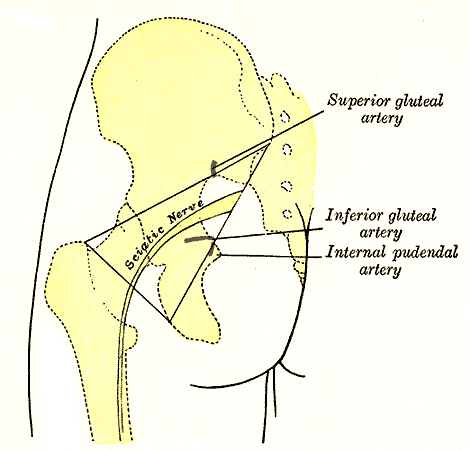
- Left gluteal region, showing surface markings for arteries and sciatic nerve

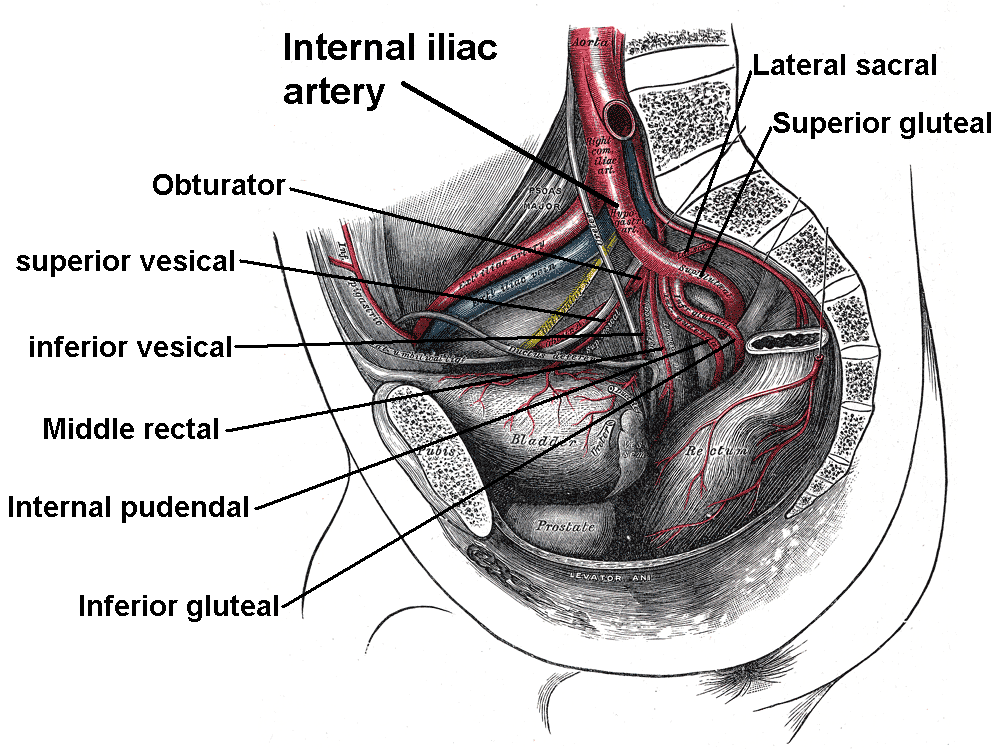
- Internal iliac artery and some of its branches (superior gluteal artery labeled at right)

Details
- Source: Internal iliac artery
- Vein: Superior gluteal veins
- Supplies: Gluteus maximus, gluteus medius, gluteus minimus and tensor fasciae latae

Identifiers
- Latin: arteria glutea superior
- TA98: A12.2.15.013
- TA2: 4310
- FMA: 18868

The superior gluteal artery is the terminal branch of the posterior division of the internal iliac artery. It exits the pelvis through the greater sciatic foramen before splitting into a superficial branch and a deep branch.

== Structure ==
=== Origin ===
The superior gluteal artery is the largest and final branch of the internal iliac artery. It branches from the posterior division of the internal iliac artery; it represents the continuation of the posterior division.

=== Course, relations and branches ===
It is a short artery. It passes posterior-ward between the lumbosacral trunk and the first sacral nerve (S1). Within the pelvis, it gives branches to the iliacus, piriformis, and obturator internus muscles. Just prior to exiting the pelvic cavity, it also gives off a nutrient artery which enters the ilium.

It exits the pelvis through the greater sciatic foramen superior to the piriformis muscle, then promptly divides into a superficial branch and a deep branch.

=== Superficial branch ===
The superficial branch passes over the piriformis muscle. It enters the deep surface of the gluteus maximus muscle, and divides into numerous branches. Some branches supply the muscle and anastomose with the inferior gluteal artery, while others perforate its tendinous origin, and supply the integument covering the posterior surface of the sacrum, anastomosing with the posterior branches of the lateral sacral arteries. The superficial branch also supplies the skin over the origin of the gluteus maximus muscle.

=== Deep branch ===
The deep branch passes deep to the gluteus medius. It almost immediately subdivides into the superior and inferior divisions.

The deep branch supplies the gluteus medius, gluteus minimus, and tensor fasciae latae muscles, as well as the hip joint.

==== Superior division ====
The superior division continues the original course of the vessel, passing along the superior border of the gluteus minimus muscle to the anterior superior spine of the ilium (ASIS), anastomosing with the deep iliac circumflex artery and the ascending branch of the lateral femoral circumflex artery.

==== Inferior division ====
The inferior division crosses the gluteus minimus obliquely to the greater trochanter, distributing branches to the gluteal muscles, and anastomoses with the lateral femoral circumflex artery.

Some branches pierce the gluteus minimus and supply the hip joint.

=== Distribution ===
Within the pelvis, it supplies the iliacus, piriformis, and obturator internus muscles, and the ilium.

In the gluteal region, the superior gluteal artery supplies the gluteus maximus and overlying skin, gluteus medius, gluteus minimus, and tensor fasciae latae.

=== Anastomoses ===
The superior gluteal artery forms anastomoses with the inferior gluteal artery, and the medial circumflex femoral artery.

The it participates in the formation of the trochanteric anastomoses, forming a connection between internal iliac and femoral artery. It contributes to anastomoses at the anterior superior iliac spine and the hip joint.

== Additional images ==
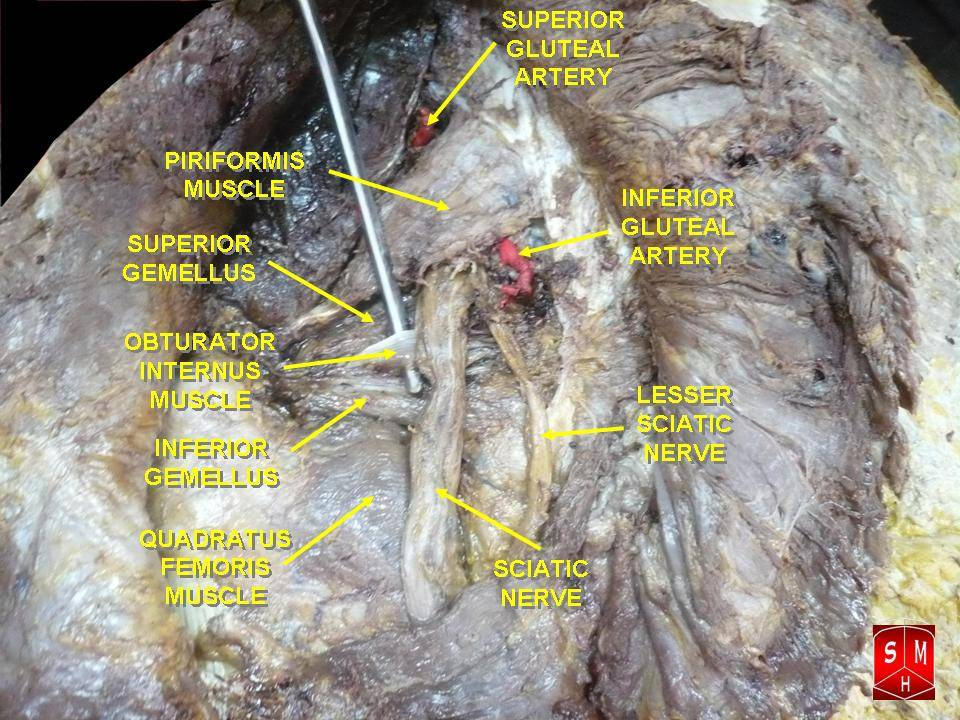
Superior gluteal artery and many of the structures it supplies.

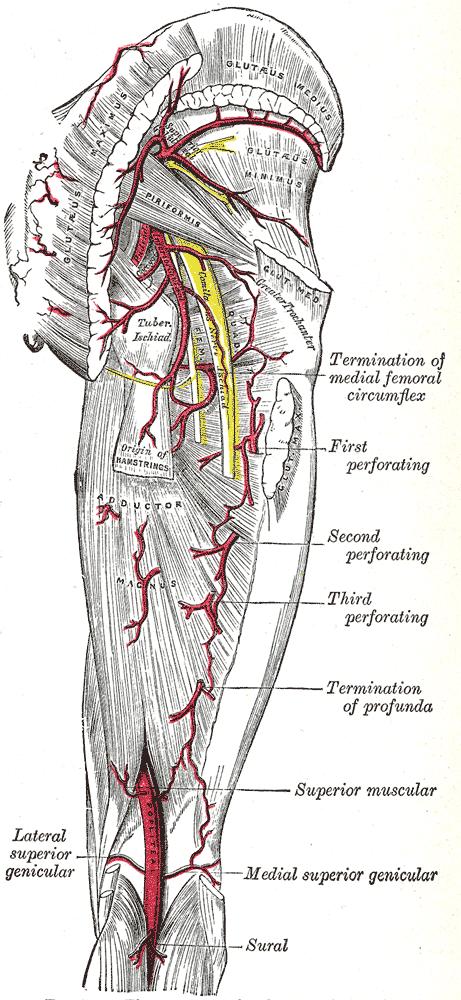
The arteries of the gluteal and posterior femoral regions.

== See also ==
- Inferior gluteal artery
