= Biceps femoris muscle =

Muscle at the back of the thigh

Biceps femoris
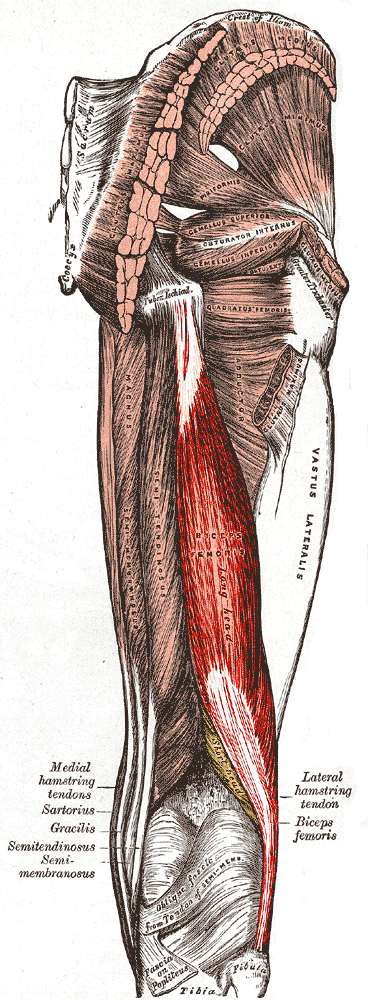
- Posterior view of right leg. Long head of muscle highlighted in red, short head (yellow) labeled in the lower part of the image

Details
- Origin: Tuberosity of the ischium, linea aspera, femur
- Insertion: The head of the fibula which articulates with the back of the lateral tibial condyle
- Artery: Deep femoral artery, perforating arteries; long head of biceps femoris: perforating branches from profunda femoris artery
- Nerve: Long head: tibial nerve short head: common fibular nerve
- Actions: Flexes knee joint, laterally rotates knee joint (when knee is flexed), extends hip joint (long head only)
- Antagonist: Quadriceps muscle

Identifiers
- Latin: musculus biceps femoris
- TA98: A04.7.02.032
- TA2: 2638
- FMA: 22356

The biceps femoris (/ˈbaɪsɛps ˈfɛmərɪs/) is a muscle of the thigh located to the posterior, or back. As its name implies, it consists of two heads; the long head is considered part of the hamstring muscle group, while the short head is sometimes excluded from this characterization, as it only causes knee flexion (but not hip extension) and is activated by a separate nerve (the peroneal, as opposed to the tibial branch of the sciatic nerve).

== Structure ==
It has two heads of origin:

- the long head arises from the lower and inner impression on the posterior part of the tuberosity of the ischium. This is a common tendon origin with the semitendinosus muscle, and from the lower part of the sacrotuberous ligament.
- the short head, arises from the lateral lip of the linea aspera, between the adductor magnus and vastus lateralis extending up almost as high as the insertion of the gluteus maximus, from the lateral prolongation of the linea aspera to within 5 cm. of the lateral condyle; and from the lateral intermuscular septum.

The two muscle heads joint together distally and unite in an intricate fashion. The fibers of the long head form a fusiform belly, which passes obliquely downward and lateralward across the sciatic nerve to end in an aponeurosis which covers the posterior surface of the muscle and receives the fibers of the short head. Inferiorly, the aponeurosis condenses to form a tendon which predominantly inserts onto the lateral side of the head of the fibula. There is a second small insertional attachment by a small tendon slip into the lateral condyle of the tibia.

At its insertion the tendon divides into two portions, which embrace the fibular collateral ligament of the knee-joint. Together, this joining of tendons is commonly referred to as the conjoined tendon of the knee.

From the posterior border of the tendon a thin expansion is given off to the fascia of the leg. The tendon of insertion of this muscle forms the lateral hamstring; the common fibular (peroneal) nerve descends along its medial border.

=== Variations ===
The short head may be absent; additional heads may arise from the ischial tuberosity, the linea aspera, the medial supracondylar ridge of the femur, or from various other parts. The tendon of insertion may be attached to the Iliotibial band and to retinacular fibers of the lateral joint capsule.

A slip may pass to the gastrocnemius.

=== Innervation ===
It is a composite muscle as the short head of the biceps femoris develops in the flexor compartment of the thigh and is thus innervated by common fibular branch of the sciatic nerve (L5, S1), while the long head is innervated by the tibial branch of the sciatic nerve (L5, S1).

=== Blood supply ===
The muscle's vascular supply is derived from the anastomoses of several arteries: the perforating branches of the profunda femoris artery, the inferior gluteal artery, and the popliteal artery.

== Function ==
Both heads of the biceps femoris perform knee flexion.

Since the long head originates in the pelvis it is involved in hip extension. The long head of the biceps femoris is a weaker knee flexor when the hip is extended (because of active insufficiency). For the same reason the long head is a weaker hip extender when the knee is flexed.

When the knee is semi-flexed, the biceps femoris in consequence of its oblique direction rotates the leg slightly outward.

== Clinical significance ==
Avulsion of the biceps femoris tendon is common in sports that require explosive bending of the knee as seen in sprinting.

== See also ==
=== Additional images ===
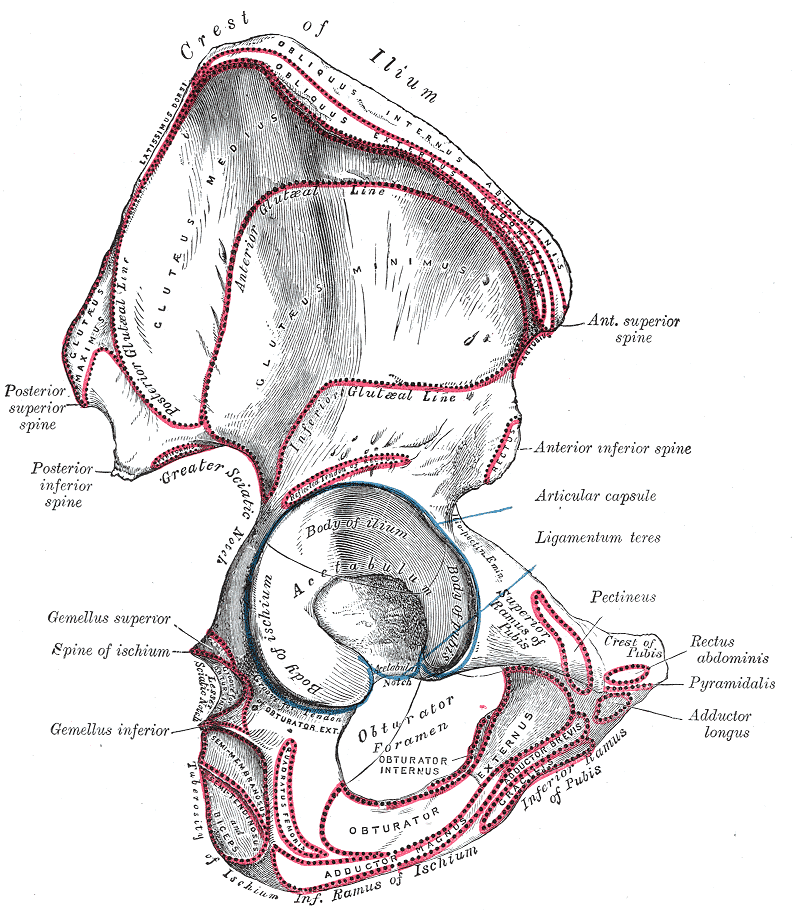
Right hip bone. External surface.

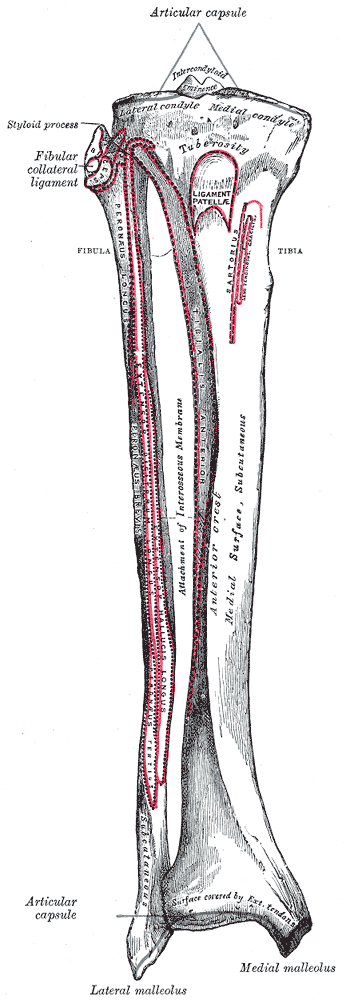
Bones of the right leg. Anterior surface.

Cross-section through the middle of the thigh.

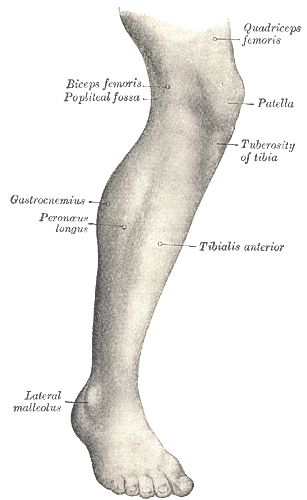
Muscles of the gluteal and posterior femoral regions.

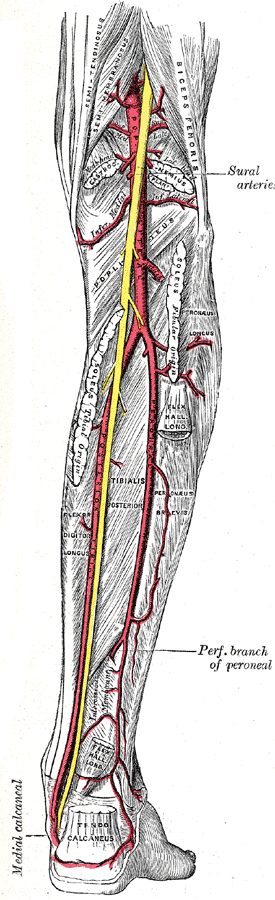
The popliteal, posterior tibial, and peroneal arteries.

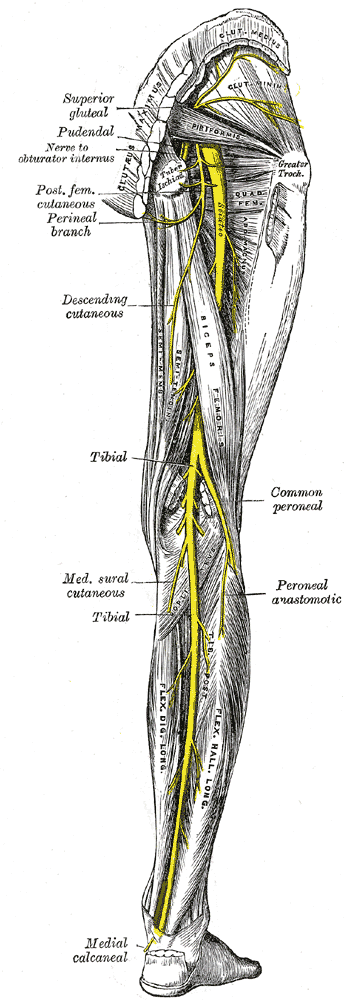
Nerves of the right lower extremity Posterior view.

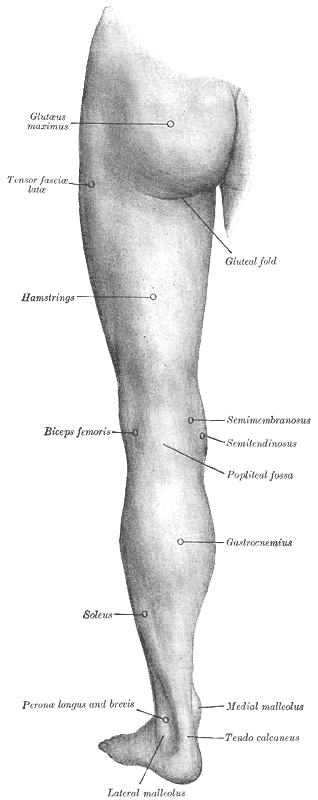
Back of left lower extremity.

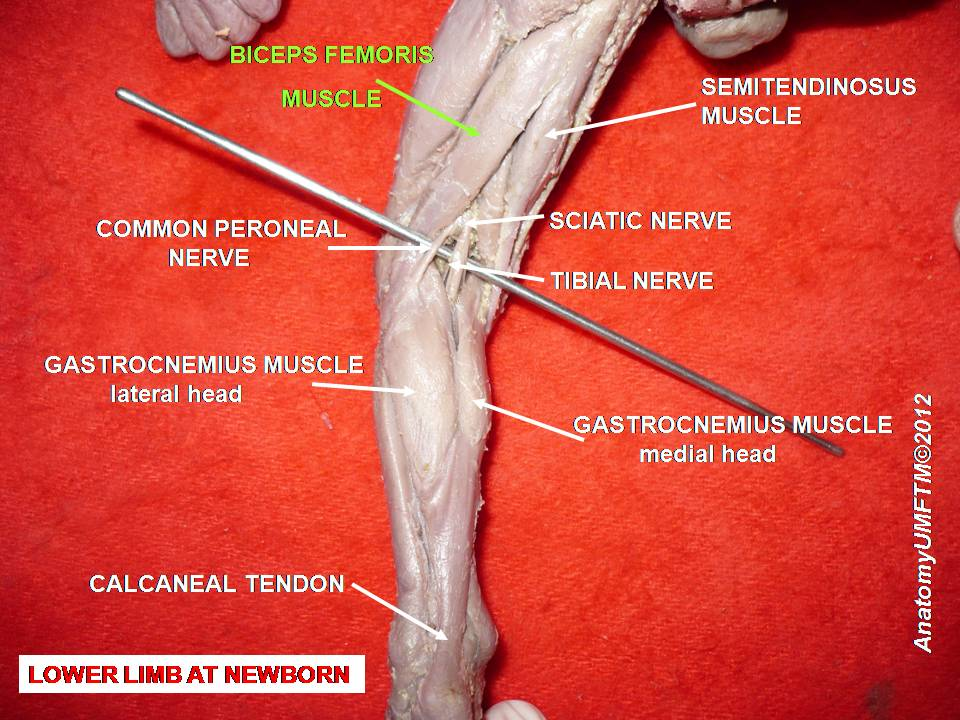
Biceps femoris
