= Lateral circumflex femoral artery =

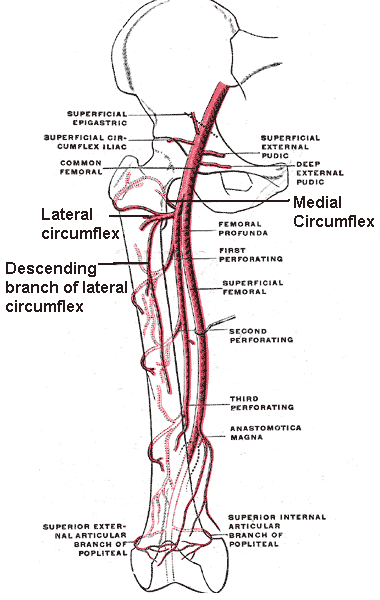
- The profunda femoris artery, femoral artery and their major branches - right thigh, anterior view. Circumflex femoral arteries labeled.

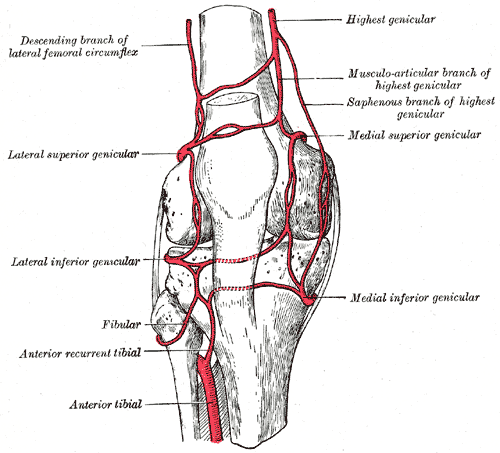
- Circumpatellar anastomosis. (Descending branch of lateral femoral circumflex visible at upper left.)

Details
- Source: Deep femoral artery

Identifiers
- Latin: arteria circumflexa femoris lateralis
- TA98: A12.2.16.027
- TA2: 4692
- FMA: 20798

The lateral circumflex femoral artery (also known as the lateral femoral circumflex artery or the external circumflex artery) is an artery in the upper thigh. It is usually a branch of the profunda femoris artery, and produces three branches. It is mostly distributed to the muscles of the lateral thigh, supplying arterial blood to muscles of the knee extensor group.

== Structure ==
=== Origin ===
The lateral femoral circumflex artery usually arises from the lateral side of the profunda femoris artery, but may occasionally arise directly from the femoral artery. It is the largest branch of the profunda femoris artery.

=== Course and relations ===
The lateral circumflex femoral artery usually courses anterior to the femoral neck. It passes horizontally between the divisions of the femoral nerve. It passes posterior to the sartorius muscle and rectus femoris muscle. It passes laterally across the hip joint capsule.

It divides into ascending, transverse, and descending branches.

=== Branches ===
The lateral circumflex femoral artery has three branches:

1. The ascending branch of lateral circumflex femoral artery passes upward, beneath the tensor fasciae latae muscle, to the lateral aspect of the hip, and anastomoses with the terminal branches of the superior gluteal and deep circumflex iliac artery.
2. The descending branch of lateral circumflex femoral artery runs downward, behind the rectus femoris, upon the vastus lateralis, to which it gives offsets; one long branch descends in the muscle as far as the knee, and anastomoses with the superior lateral genicular artery. It is accompanied by the branch of the femoral nerve to the vastus lateralis muscle.
3. The transverse branch of lateral circumflex femoral artery is a small artery in the thigh. It is the smallest branch of the lateral circumflex femoral artery and passes lateralward over the vastus intermedius, pierces the vastus lateralis, and winds around the femur, just below the greater trochanter, anastomosing on the back of the thigh with the medial femoral circumflex artery, the inferior gluteal artery, and the perforating arteries of the profunda femoris artery.

=== Distribution ===
The lateral circumflex femoral artery mainly supplies muscles of the lateral thigh, supplying the vastus lateralis, vastus intermedius, and rectus femoris muscles. Due to the fact that it passes across the thickest part of the hip joint capsule, it is in a less suitable position to supply the proximal femur so that most of the arterial supply to the head and neck of the femur is instead afforded by the medial circumflex femoral artery.

=== Variation ===
Origin

The lateral femoral circumflex artery has a variable origin. In 67% of people, it arises 1.5 cm inferior to the origin of the profunda femoris artery, and in others it arises at different distances from this origin. In up to 20% of people, it arises directly from the femoral artery.

Course

A rare variant, where the lateral circumflex femoral artery passes posterior to the femoral nerve, has also been reported (this is important in orthopaedic surgery).

== See also ==
- Medial femoral circumflex artery

== Additional images ==
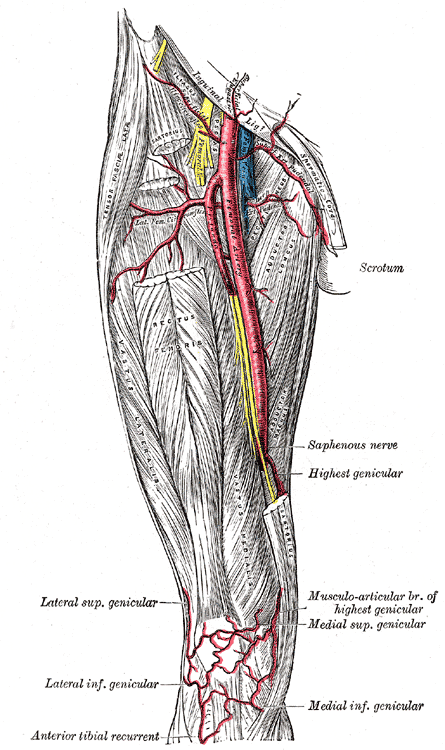
The femoral artery.

Labeled arteries of the thigh.

Arteries of the thigh labeled with numbers. The lateral circumflex femoral is labeled as #5.

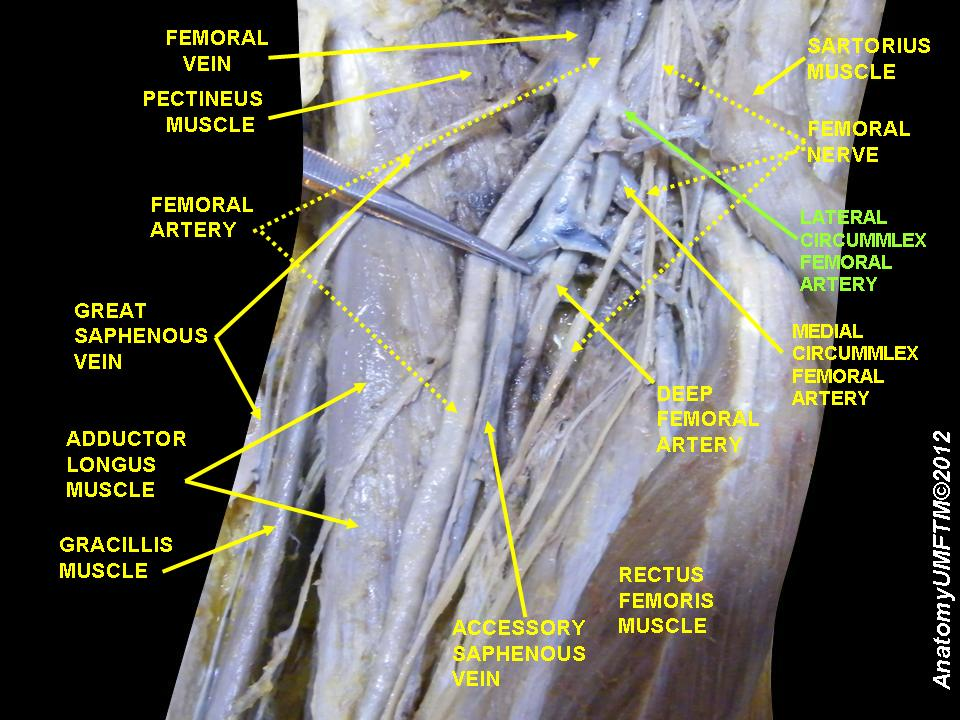
Lateral circumflex femoral artery
