= Deep femoral artery =

Large branch of the femoral artery that supplies the thigh

- Cross-section through the middle of the right thigh.

Details
- Source: Femoral artery
- Branches: Lateral femoral circumflex Medial femoral circumflex Perforating
- Vein: Deep femoral vein

Identifiers
- Latin: arteria profunda femoris
- TA98: A12.2.16.020
- TA2: 4685
- FMA: 20741

The deep femoral artery also known as the deep artery of the thigh, or profunda femoris artery, is a large branch of the femoral artery. It travels more deeply ("profoundly") than the rest of the femoral artery. It gives rise to the lateral circumflex femoral artery and medial circumflex femoral artery, and the perforating arteries, terminating within the thigh.

== Structure ==
=== Origin ===
The deep femoral artery branches off the posterolateral side of the femoral artery soon after its origin.

=== Course ===
It travels down the thigh closer to the femur than the femoral artery. It runs between the pectineus muscle and the adductor longus muscle. It runs on the posterior side of adductor longus muscle. It pierces the adductor magnus muscle, and may be known as the fourth perforating artery as it continues. The deep femoral artery does not leave the thigh; terminating as perforating tissue branches within the thigh.

=== Branches ===
The deep femoral artery gives off the following branches:

- Lateral circumflex femoral artery.
- Medial circumflex femoral artery.
- 3 perforating arteries that perforate the adductor magnus muscle to the posterior and medial compartments of the thigh to connect with the branches of the popliteal artery behind the knee. The perforating arteries arise in the anterior compartment of thigh. The terminal continuation of the deep femoral artery may be regarded as the fourth perforating artery.

=== Distribution ===
The deep femoral artery is the main supply of oxygenated blood to the thigh.

The medial circumflex femoral artery distributes to the adductor group (adductor longus, magnus, and brevis), gracilis, and pectineus. It also supplies the femoral head and neck.

The lateral circumflex femoral artery supplies muscles of the knee extensor group (vastus lateralis, vastus intermedius, and rectus femoris).

The perforating arteries supply the hamstring muscles (semitendinosus, semimembranosus, and biceps femoris).

== Additional images ==
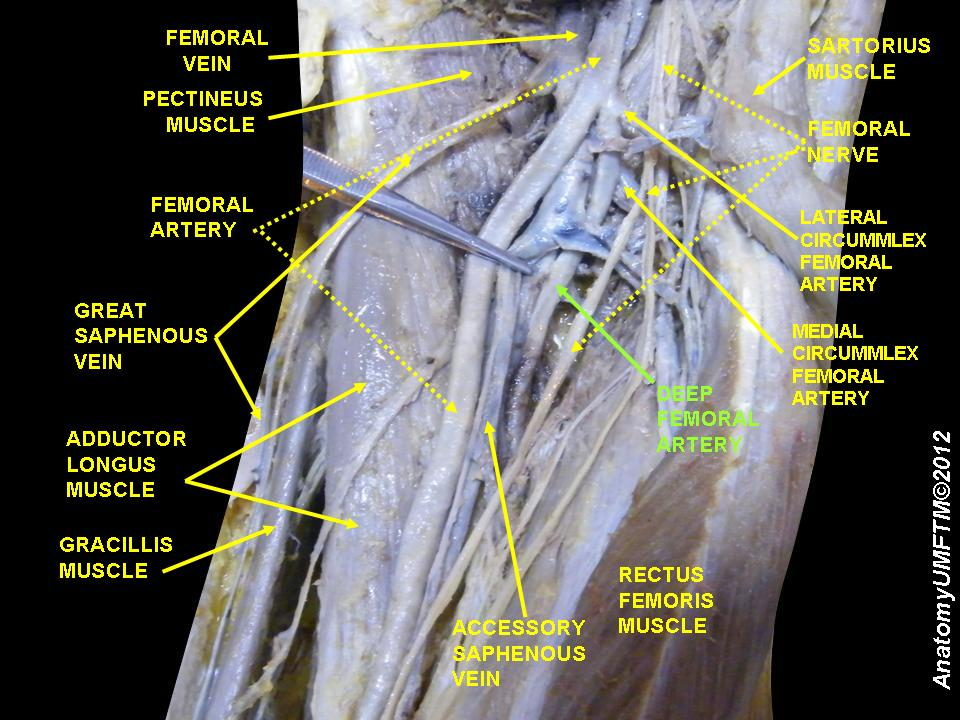
Deep femoral artery

== See also ==
- Obturator artery
