= Medial circumflex femoral artery =

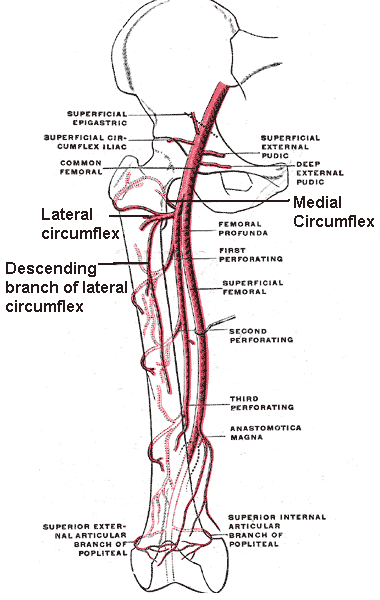
- The profunda femoris artery, femoral artery and their major branches - right thigh, anterior view. Circumflex femoral arteries labeled.

Details
- Source: Deep femoral artery, femoral artery
- Supplies: Thigh

Identifiers
- Latin: arteria circumflexa femoris medialis
- TA98: A12.2.16.021
- TA2: 4686
- FMA: 20799

The medial circumflex femoral artery (internal circumflex artery, medial femoral circumflex artery) is an artery in the upper thigh that arises from the profunda femoris artery. It supplies arterial blood to several muscles in the region, as well as the femoral head and neck.

Damage to the artery following a femoral neck fracture may lead to avascular necrosis (ischemic) of the femoral neck/head.

== Structure ==
=== Origin ===
The medial femoral circumflex artery arises from the posteromedial aspect of the profunda femoris artery.

The medial femoral circumflex artery may occasionally arise directly from the femoral artery.

=== Course and relations ===
It winds around the medial side of the femur to pass along the posterior aspect of the femur. It first passes between the pectineus and the iliopsoas muscles, then between the obturator externus and the adductor brevis muscles.

=== Branches ===
At the upper border of the adductor brevis it gives off two branches:

- The ascending branch
- The descending branch descends beneath the adductor brevis, to supply it and the adductor magnus; the continuation of the vessel passes backward and divides into superficial, deep, and acetabular branches.
  - The superficial branch
  - The deep branch
  - The acetabular branch

=== Distribution ===
The medial femoral circumflex artery (with its branches) supplies arterial blood to several muscles, including: the adductor muscles of the hip, gracilis muscle, pectineus muscle, and external obturator muscle. It delivers most of the arterial supply to the femoral head and femoral neck via branches - the posterior retinacular arteries.

== Clinical significance ==
Branches of the medial circumflex femoral artery supplying the head and neck of the femur are often torn in femoral neck fractures and in hip dislocation.

== See also ==
- Lateral femoral circumflex artery

== Additional images ==
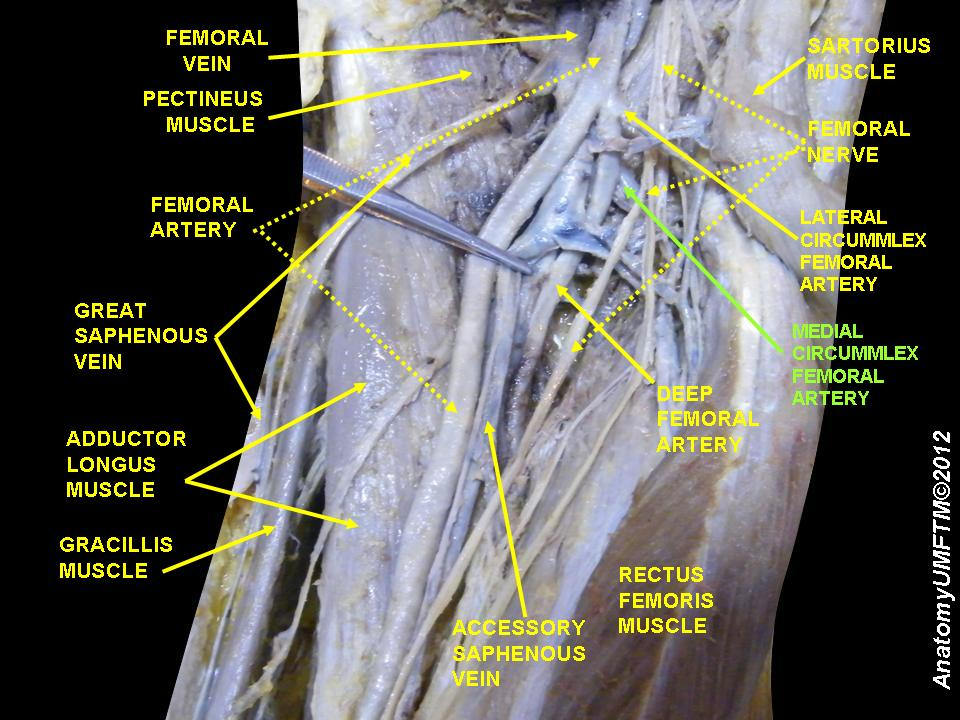
Medial circumflex femoral artery
