= Lateral intermuscular septum of thigh =

Fold of deep fascia in the thigh

- Cross-section through the middle of the thigh.

Details

Identifiers
- Latin: septum intermusculare femoris laterale
- TA98: A04.7.03.004
- TA2: 2691
- FMA: 58746

The lateral intermuscular septum of thigh is a fold of deep fascia in the thigh.

It is between the vastus lateralis and biceps femoris.

It separates the anterior compartment of the thigh from the posterior compartment of the thigh.

== See also ==
- Medial intermuscular septum of thigh
- Anterior compartment of thigh
- Posterior compartment of thigh
