= Medial intermuscular septum of thigh =

Fold of deep fascia in the thigh

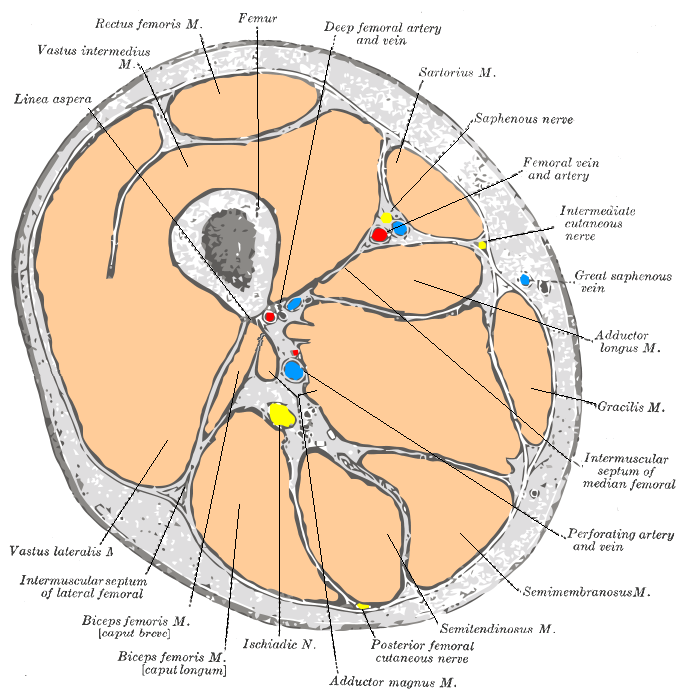
- Cross-section through the middle of the thigh

Details

Identifiers
- Latin: septum intermusculare femoris mediale
- TA98: A04.7.03.005
- TA2: 2692
- FMA: 58749

The medial intermuscular septum of thigh is a fold of deep fascia in the thigh.

It is between the vastus medialis, and the adductors and pectineus.

It separates the anterior compartment of the thigh from the medial compartment of the thigh.

== See also ==
- Lateral intermuscular septum of thigh
- Anterior compartment of thigh
- Medial compartment of thigh
