= Inferior gluteal artery =

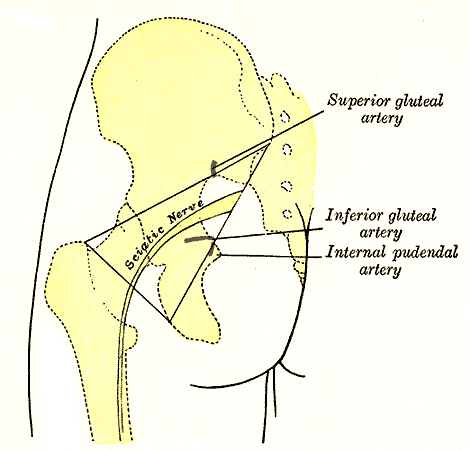
- Left gluteal region, showing surface markings for arteries and sciatic nerve

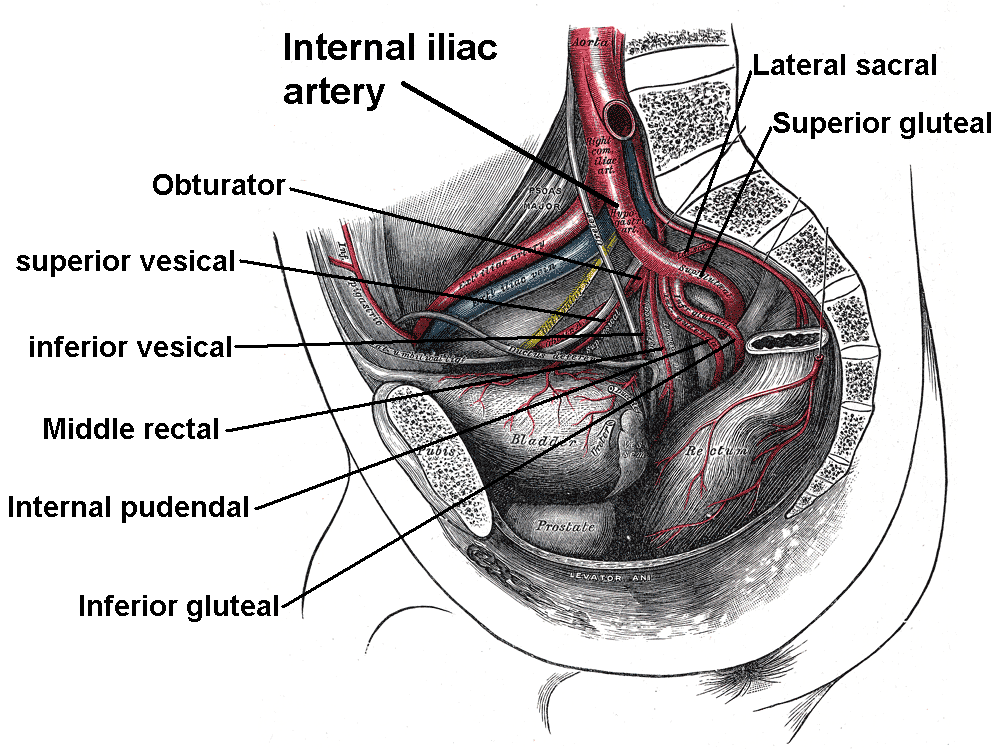
- Internal iliac artery and branches, including inferior gluteal artery

Details
- Source: Internal iliac artery
- Branches: Accompanying artery of ischiadic nerve
- Vein: Inferior gluteal veins
- Supplies: Gluteus maximus, piriformis and quadratus femoris muscles

Identifiers
- Latin: arteria glutea inferior
- TA98: A12.2.15.018
- TA2: 4355
- FMA: 18871

The inferior gluteal artery (sciatic artery) is a terminal branch of the anterior trunk of the internal iliac artery. It exits the pelvis through the greater sciatic foramen. It is distributed chiefly to the buttock and the back of the thigh.

== Anatomy ==
=== Origin ===
It is the smaller of the two terminal branches of the anterior trunk of the internal iliac artery.

=== Course ===
It passes posterior-ward within parietal pelvic fascia. It travels in between the S1 nerve and S2 (or S2-S3) nerve(s). It descends upon the nerves of the sacral plexus and the piriformis muscle, posterior to the internal pudendal artery. It passes through the inferior part of the greater sciatic foramen. It exits the pelvis inferior to the piriformis muscle, between piriformis muscle and coccygeus muscle.

It then descends in the interval between the greater trochanter of the femur and tuberosity of the ischium. It is accompanied by the sciatic nerve and the posterior femoral cutaneous nerves, and covered by the gluteus maximus. It is situated medial to the sciatic nerve. It continues down the back of the thigh, supplying the skin, and anastomosing with branches of the perforating arteries.

=== Distribution ===
The inferior gluteal artery provides arterial supply to the gluteus maximus, obturator internus, quadratus femoris, and (the superior parts of) the hamstring muscles (semimembranosus, semitendinosus, and biceps femoris muscles).

=== Anastomoses ===
It forms anastomoses with the superior gluteal artery. It frequently participates in the formation of the cruciate anastomosis of the thigh.

== Additional images ==
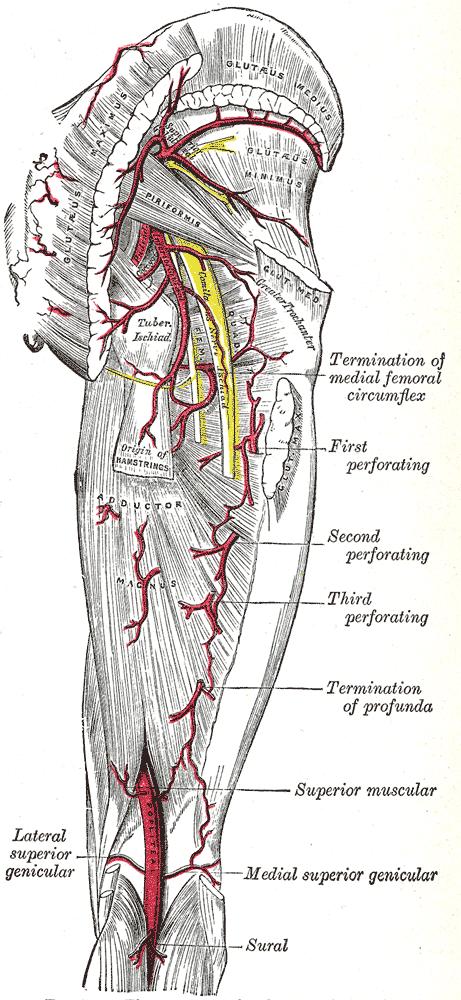
The arteries of the gluteal and posterior femoral regions.

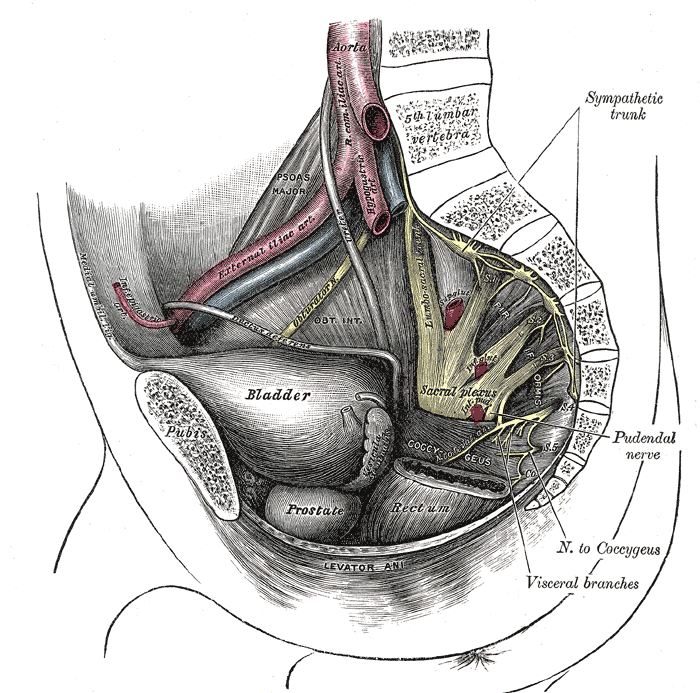
Dissection of side wall of pelvis showing sacral and pudendal plexuses.

Dissection images
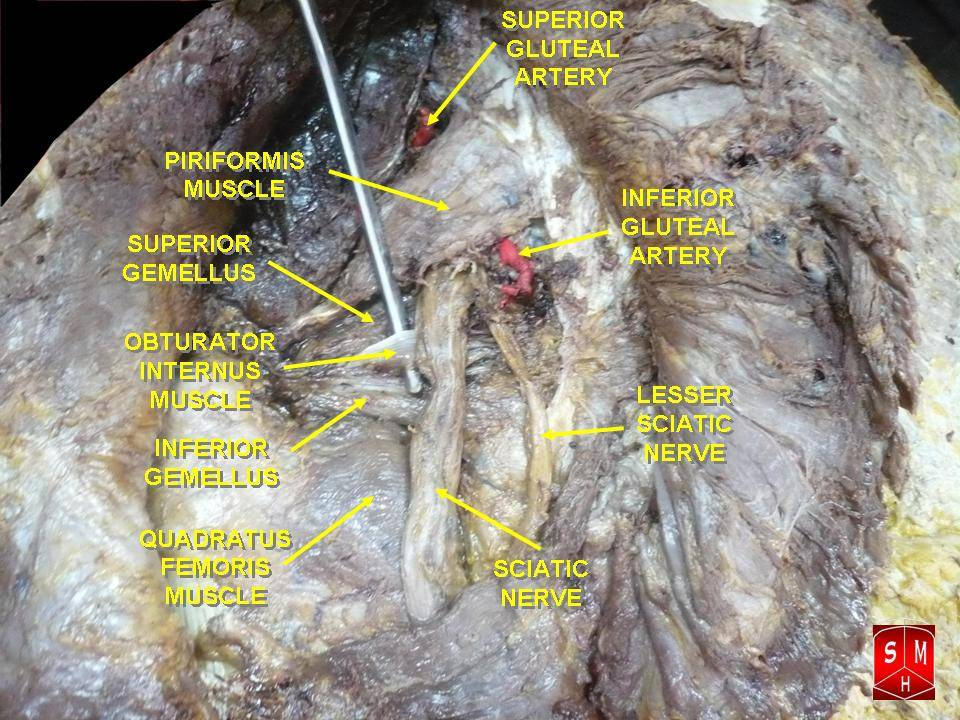
Inferior gluteal artery.

== See also ==
- Superior gluteal artery
