= Thigh =

Body part between pelvis and knee; upper leg

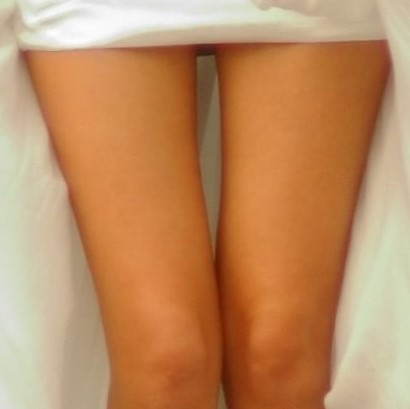
- A woman's thighs

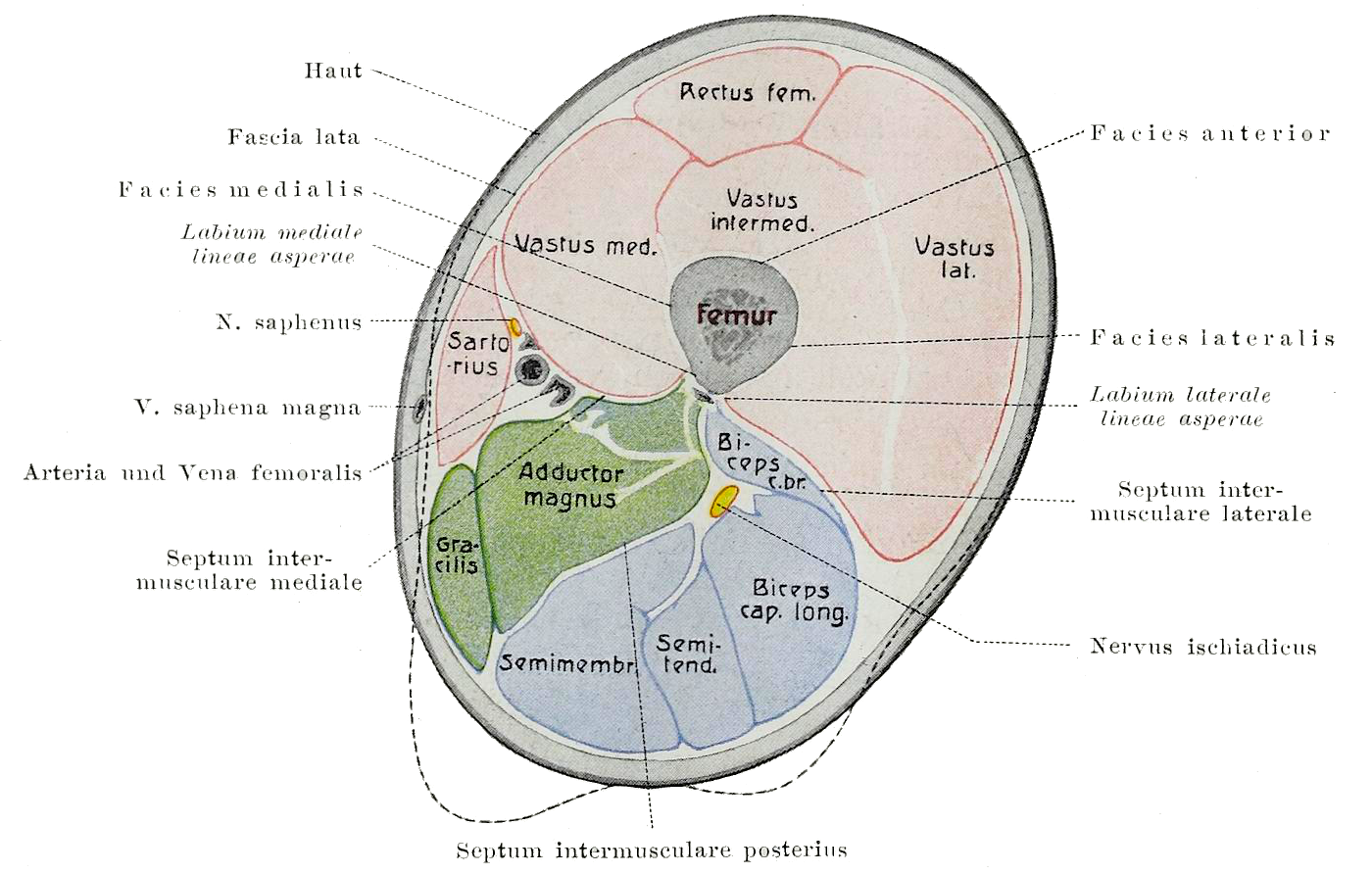
- Cross-section of the thigh showing muscles and bone (latin terminology)

Details

Identifiers
- Latin: femur
- MeSH: D013848
- TA98: A01.1.00.035
- TA2: 160
- FMA: 24967

In anatomy, the thigh is the area between the hip (pelvis) and the knee. Anatomically, it is part of the lower limb.

The single bone in the thigh is called the femur. This bone is very thick and strong (due to the high proportion of bone tissue), and forms a ball and socket joint at the hip, and a modified hinge joint at the knee.

== Structure ==
=== Bones ===
The femur is the only bone in the thigh and serves as an attachment site for all thigh muscles. The head of the femur articulates with the acetabulum in the pelvic bone forming the hip joint, while the distal part of the femur articulates with the tibia and patella forming the knee. By most measures, the femur is the strongest and longest bone in the body.

The femur is categorised as a long bone and comprises a diaphysis, the shaft (or body) and two epiphyses, the lower extremity and the upper extremity of femur, that articulate with adjacent bones in the hip and knee.

=== Muscular compartments ===
In cross-section, the thigh is divided up into three separate compartments, divided by fascia, each containing muscles. These compartments use the femur as an axis and are separated by tough connective tissue membranes (or septa). Each of these compartments has its own blood and nerve supply, and contains a different group of muscles.

- Medial fascial compartment of thigh, adductor
- Posterior fascial compartment of thigh, flexion, hamstring
- Anterior fascial compartment of thigh, extension

Anterior compartment muscles of the thigh include sartorius, and the four muscles that comprise the quadriceps muscles – rectus femoris, vastus medialis, vastus intermedius and vastus lateralis.

Posterior compartment muscles of the thigh are the hamstring muscles, which include semimembranosus, semitendinosus, and biceps femoris.

Medial compartment muscles are pectineus, adductor magnus, adductor longus and adductor brevis, and also gracilis.

Because the major muscles of the thigh are the largest muscles of the body, resistance exercises (strength training) of them stimulate blood flow more than any other localized activity.

=== Blood supply ===
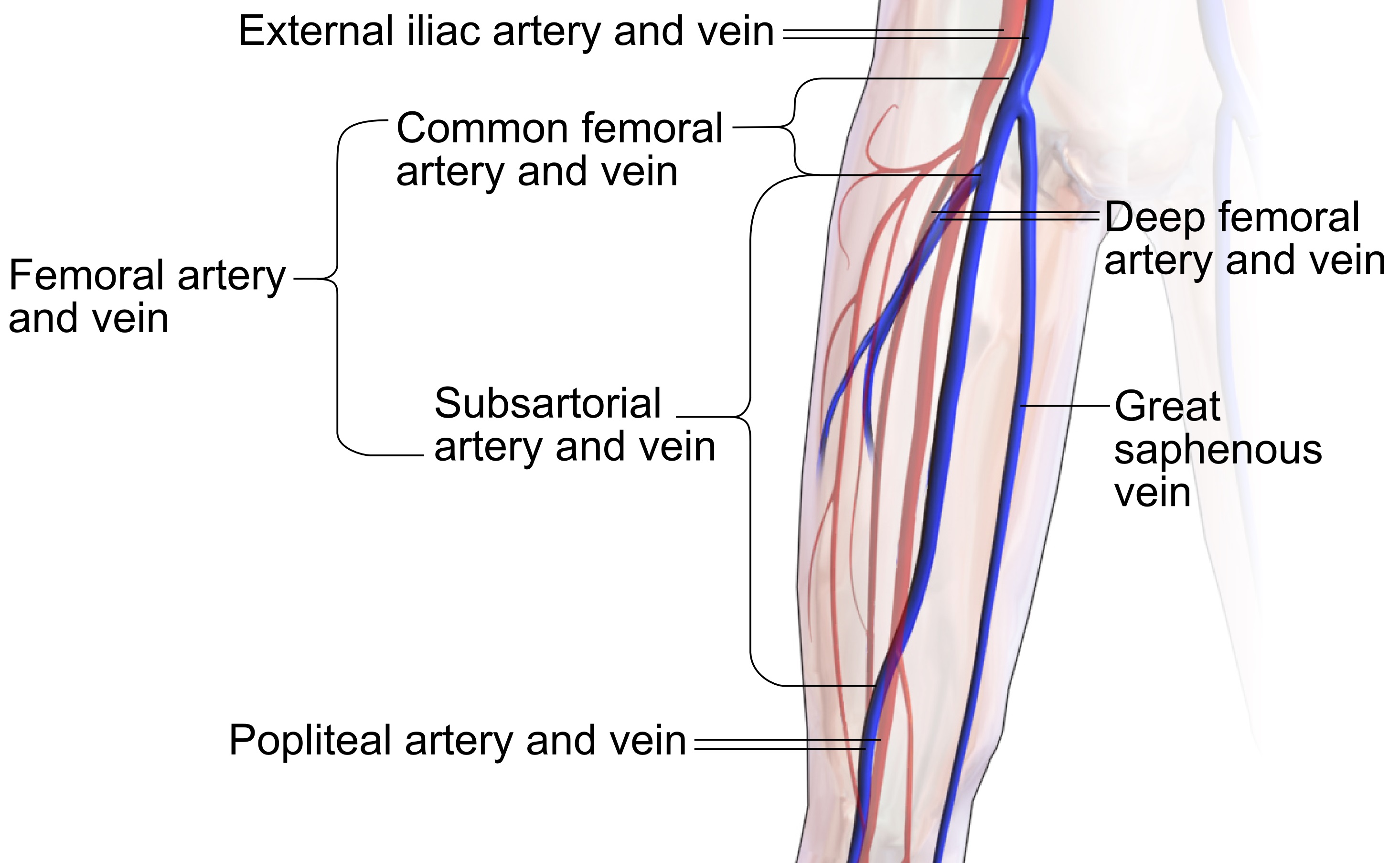
Main blood vessels of the thigh.

The arterial supply is by the femoral artery and the obturator artery. The lymphatic drainage closely follows the arterial supply and drains to the lumbar lymphatic trunks on the corresponding side, which in turn drains to the cisterna chyli.

The deep venous system of the thigh consists of the femoral vein, common femoral vein, deep femoral vein, the proximal part of the popliteal vein, and various smaller vessels; thighs are the site of proximal deep vein thrombosis. The perforating veins connect the deep and the superficial system, which consists of the small and great saphenous veins (the site of varicose veins).

== Clinical significance ==
Thigh weakness can result in a positive Gowers' sign on physical examination.

Thigh injury resulting from sports, whether acute or from overuse, can mean significant incapacity to perform. Soft tissue injury can encompass sprains, strains, bruising and tendinitis.

Runner's knee (patellofemoral pain) is a direct consequence of the kneecap rubbing against the end of the thigh bone (femur). Tight hamstrings and weak thigh muscles, required to stabilize the knee, increase the risk of developing of runner's knee.

== Society and culture ==
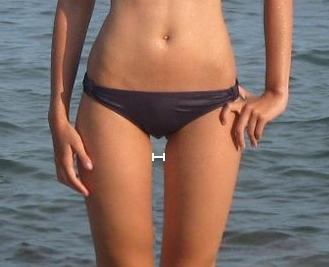
Thigh gap

Western societies generally tolerate clothing that displays thighs, such as short shorts and miniskirts. Beachwear and many athleisure styles often display thighs as well. Professional dress codes may require covering up bare thighs.

Many Islamic countries disapprove of or prohibit the display of thighs (especially by women), as they are considered parts of 'awrah for both men and women.

Strategic covering or display of thighs is used in popular fashion around the world, such as thigh-high boots and zettai ryoiki.

== Additional images ==
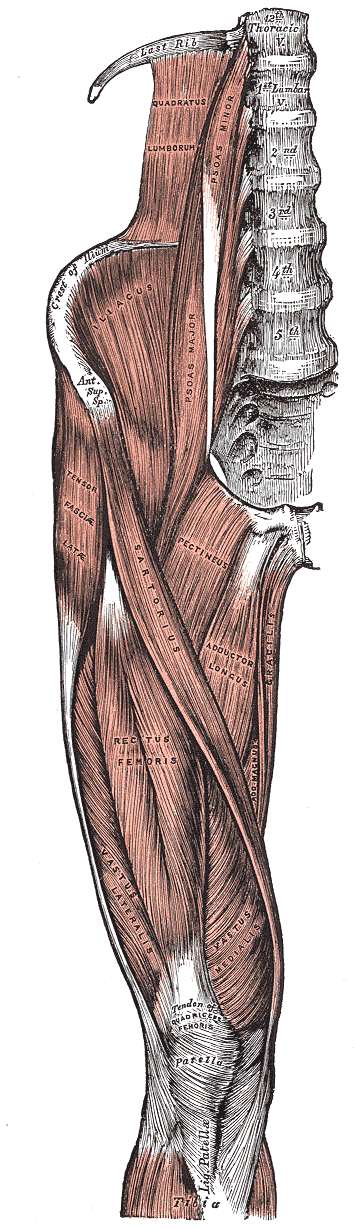
Front of thigh muscles from Gray's Anatomy of the human body from 1918.

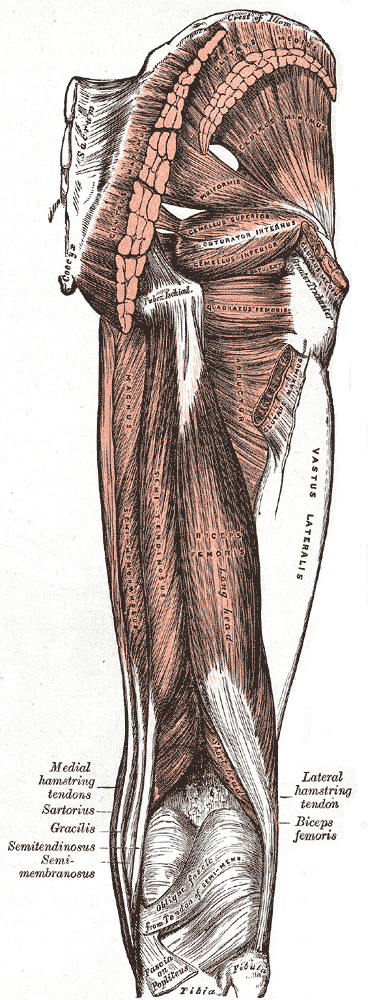
Back thigh muscles of the gluteal and posterior femoral regions from Gray's Anatomy of the human body from 1918.

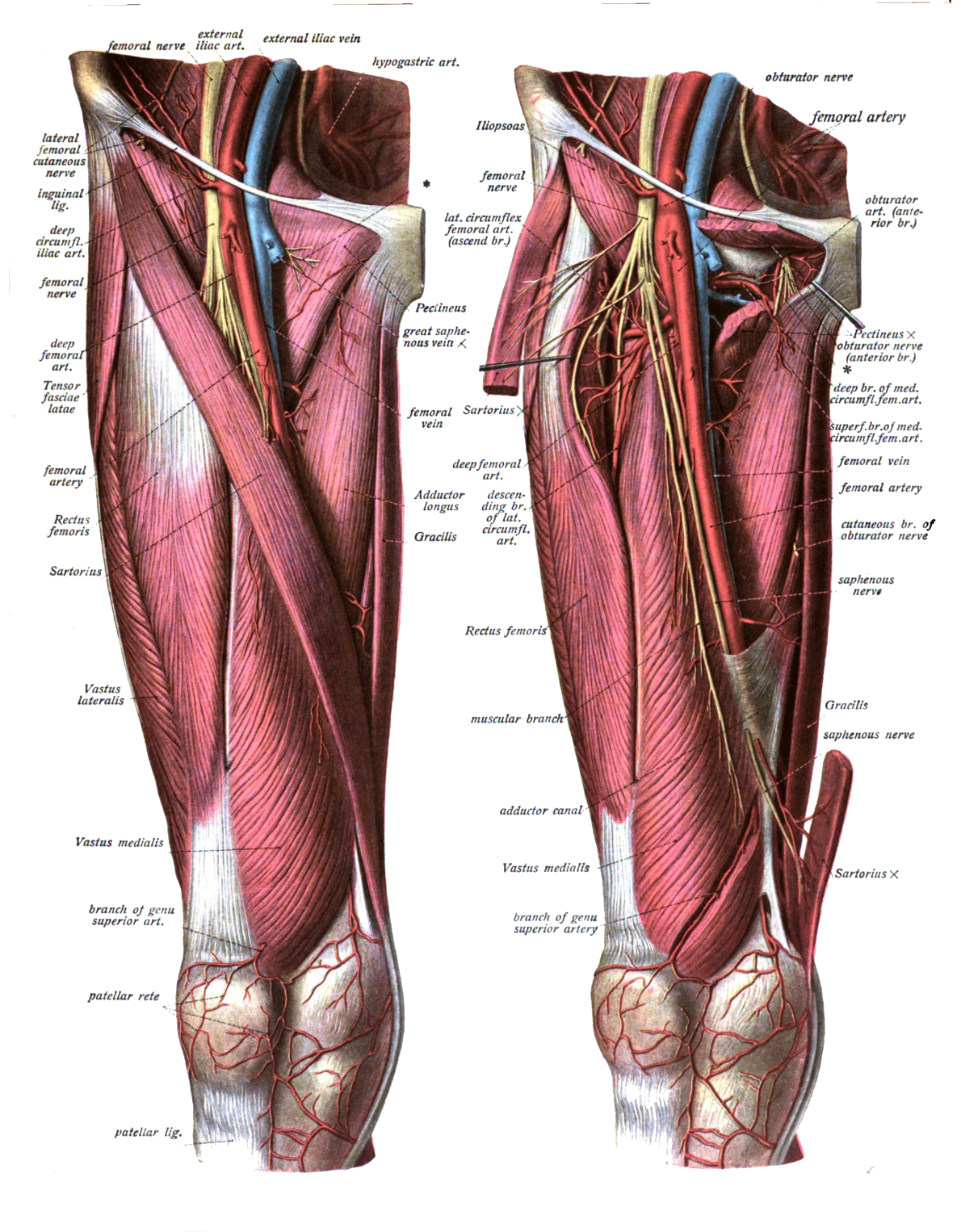
Also showing major blood vessels and nerves.

Cross-section through the middle of the thigh.

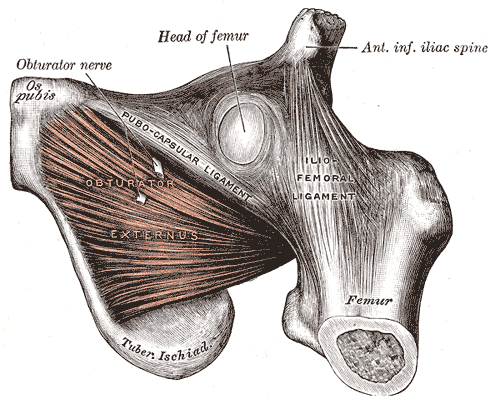
The obturator externus
