= Relaxin family peptide hormones =

Protein family

Relaxin-1
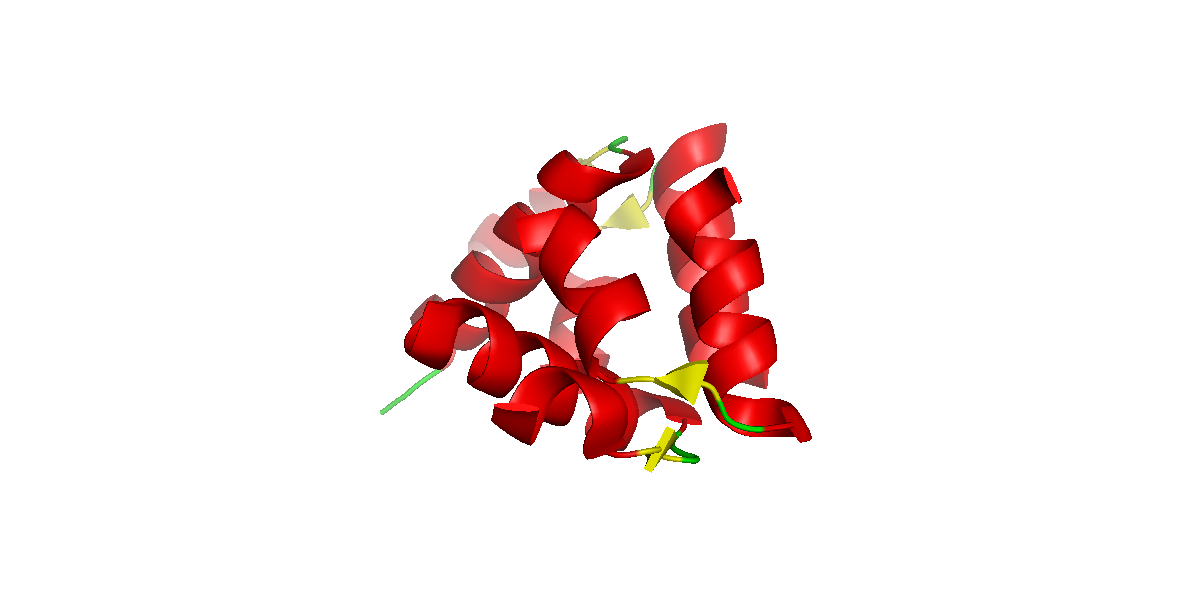

Identifiers
- Symbol: RLN1
- Alt. symbols: H1
- NCBI gene: 6013
- HGNC: 10026
- OMIM: 179730
- RefSeq: NM_006911
- UniProt: P04808

Other data
- Locus: Chr. 9 qter-q12
Search for
- Structures: Swiss-model
- Domains: InterPro

Relaxin-2

Identifiers
- Symbol: RLN2
- Alt. symbols: H2, RLXH2, bA12D24.1.1, bA12D24.1.2
- NCBI gene: 6019
- HGNC: 10027
- OMIM: 179740
- PDB: 6RLX
- RefSeq: NM_134441
- UniProt: P04090

Other data
- Locus: Chr. 9 qter-q12
Search for
- Structures: Swiss-model
- Domains: InterPro

Relaxin-3

Identifiers
- Symbol: RLN3
- Alt. symbols: ZINS4, RXN3, H3
- NCBI gene: 117579
- HGNC: 17135
- OMIM: 606855
- RefSeq: NM_080864
- UniProt: Q8WXF3

Other data
- Locus: Chr. 19 p13.3
Search for
- Structures: Swiss-model
- Domains: InterPro

Insulin-like peptide 3

Identifiers
- Symbol: INSL3
- Alt. symbols: RLNL
- NCBI gene: 3640
- HGNC: 6086
- OMIM: 146738
- RefSeq: NM_005543
- UniProt: P51460

Other data
- Locus: Chr. 19 p13.11
Search for
- Structures: Swiss-model
- Domains: InterPro

Insulin-like peptide 4

Identifiers
- Symbol: INSL4
- NCBI gene: 3641
- HGNC: 6087
- OMIM: 600910
- RefSeq: NM_002195
- UniProt: Q14641

Other data
- Locus: Chr. 9 p24.1
Search for
- Structures: Swiss-model
- Domains: InterPro

Insulin-like peptide 5

Identifiers
- Symbol: INSL5
- NCBI gene: 10022
- HGNC: 6088
- OMIM: 606413
- RefSeq: NM_005478
- UniProt: Q9Y5Q6

Other data
- Locus: Chr. 1 p31.3
Search for
- Structures: Swiss-model
- Domains: InterPro

Insulin-like peptide 6

Identifiers
- Symbol: INSL6
- NCBI gene: 11172
- HGNC: 6089
- OMIM: 606414
- RefSeq: NM_007179
- UniProt: Q9Y581

Other data
- Locus: Chr. 9 p24.1
Search for
- Structures: Swiss-model
- Domains: InterPro

Relaxin family peptide hormones in humans are represented by seven members: three relaxin-like (RLN) and four insulin-like (INSL) peptides: RLN1, RLN2, RNL3, INSL3, INSL4, INSL5, INSL6. This subdivision into two classes (RLN and INSL) is based primarily on early findings, and does not reflect the evolutionary origins or physiological differences between peptides. For example, it is known that the genes coding for RLN3 and INSL5 arose from one ancestral gene, and INSL3 shares origin with RLN2 and its multiple duplicates: RLN1, INSL4, INSL6.

== Genetics ==
In humans and many other tetrapods, the RLN/INSL-encoding genes exist in four distinct clusters. The largest cluster contains four loci: RLN1, RLN2, INSL4 and INSL6, situated in tandem on human chromosome 9. This cluster arose from multiple local gene duplications that took place in the ancestor of placental mammals. The other three RLN/INSL genes exist as single loci in two linkage groups: RLN3 (chromosome 19), INSL3 (chromosome 19, 3.8 Mb apart from RLN3) and INSL5 (chromosome 1).

== Synthesis and Structure ==
All seven relaxin family peptide hormones are synthesized as pre-prohormones, and subsequently cleaved to form two chains stabilized by an intra-α-chain and two disulfide bonds. Members of the human relaxin peptide family share a similar tertiary structure, composed of a β-chain, c-chain, and α-chain at their carboxyl-terminal. All members of the relaxin family peptide hormones bind to their cognate receptors via residues present in their α- and β-chains.

== Functions ==
The physiological action of RLN and its tandem duplicates (RLN1, INSL4, INSL6) and INSL3 has been quite well studied in humans and mouse models. They are primarily associated with reproductive functions, such as the relaxation of uterine musculature and of the pubic symphysis during labor (RLN1 & RLN2), the progression of spermatogenesis (INSL6) and possibly trophoblast development (INSL4) and testicular descent and germ cell survival (INSL3).

INSL5 is produced by L-cells in the colon, plays a physiological role in food intake, and may regulate metabolism and energy balance. RLN3 is thought to function in neuroendocrine regulation, and is predominantly expressed in the nucleus incertus (NI) of the hindbrain and locally affects regions of the central nervous system (CNS) including those responsible for appetite and stress regulation. RLN3 has also been found to stimulate the hypothalamic-pituitary-gonadal (HPG) axis and hence affects levels of luteinizing hormone (LH) in the blood.

== Receptors ==
The receptors for the RLN/INSL peptides are collectively called "Relaxin family peptide receptors (RXFPs)". In humans there are four RXFP receptors (RXFP1-4) all of which are cell membrane-associated and coupled to G-proteins (known as G protein-coupled receptors or GPCRs). There are two distinct families of RXFPs: RXFP1 and RXFP2 are evolutionarily related to the receptors of follicle-stimulating hormone (FSH) and LH, and are the cognate receptors for RLN and INSL3 respectively in humans. On the other hand, RXFP3 and RXFP4 are related to somatostatin and, in humans, are the cognate receptors for RLN3 and INSL5. There is evidence that some relaxin hormones may also be able to interact with glucocorticoid-type nuclear receptors, which float freely between the cytoplasm and nucleoplasm.

=== Receptor Genetics ===
Four RXFPs in humans are located in different linkage groups. Additionally there are two RXFP pseudogenes ("RXFP3-3" and "RXFP2-like") which have functional counterparts in other species.

== Evolution ==
=== In early deuterostomes ===
The evolution of the gene family in primitive vertebrates is not well understood. For example, it has been shown that the gene coding for the ancestral relaxin peptide existed independently from the other genes of the insulin superfamily, i.e. INS and IGF genes, in the early chordate ancestor.

It is known that the genes coding for RLN3 and INSL5 arose from one ancestral gene, and INSL3 shares origin with RLN2 and its multiple duplicates. However the exact origins of the family still remain to be elucidated. Other studies attempted to show the existence of relaxin family peptide genes in the tunicate Ciona, but it has not been shown that any of these are in the same linkage group as modern relaxin genes. Multiple relaxin genes have also been identified in Amphioxus, but again syntenic relationship of these genes to modern relaxin genes is unclear and experimental work is lacking. A relaxin-like peptide, previously referred to as "Gonad Stimulating Substance" was also characterized in the echinoderm Patiria pectinifera (starfish). There is evidence that the starfish peptide is involved in reproductive processes and functions via a GPCR, which supports its relatedness to vertebrate relaxins.

=== In vertebrates ===
Relaxin peptides and their receptors are an example of vigorously diversified ligand-receptor systems in vertebrates. The number of peptides and their receptors is varied among vertebrates due to lineage specific gene loss and duplications For example, teleost fish have almost twice as many RXFP compared to humans, which is attributable to the Fish-Specific Whole Genome Duplication and teleost-specific gene duplication.

== See also ==
- Relaxin
- Relaxin receptor
- Relaxin/insulin-like family peptide receptor 1
