= Relaxin receptor =

InterPro Family

relaxin/insulin-like family peptide receptor 1

Identifiers
- Symbol: RXFP1
- Alt. symbols: LGR7
- NCBI gene: 59350
- HGNC: 19718
- OMIM: 606654
- RefSeq: NM_021634
- UniProt: Q9HBX9

Other data
- Locus: Chr. 4 q31.3
Search for
- Structures: Swiss-model
- Domains: InterPro

relaxin/insulin-like family peptide receptor 2

Identifiers
- Symbol: RXFP2
- Alt. symbols: LGR8, GREAT, GPR106, INSL3R
- NCBI gene: 122042
- HGNC: 17318
- OMIM: 606655
- RefSeq: NM_130806
- UniProt: Q8WXD0

Other data
- Locus: Chr. 13 q12.3
Search for
- Structures: Swiss-model
- Domains: InterPro

relaxin/insulin-like family peptide receptor 3

Identifiers
- Symbol: RXFP3
- Alt. symbols: RLN3R1, SALPR, GPCR135
- NCBI gene: 51289
- HGNC: 24883
- OMIM: 609445
- RefSeq: NM_016568
- UniProt: Q9NSD7

Other data
- Locus: Chr. 5 p15.1-p14
Search for
- Structures: Swiss-model
- Domains: InterPro

relaxin/insulin-like family peptide receptor 4

Identifiers
- Symbol: RXFP4
- Alt. symbols: GPR100, GPCR142, RLN3R2
- NCBI gene: 339403
- HGNC: 14666
- OMIM: 609043
- RefSeq: NM_181885
- UniProt: Q8TDU9

Other data
- Locus: Chr. 1 q22
Search for
- Structures: Swiss-model
- Domains: InterPro

The relaxin receptors are a subclass of four closely related G protein-coupled receptors (GPCR) that bind relaxin peptide hormones.

Below is list of human relaxin receptors, their endogenous peptide hormones, and what downstream enzymes are activated or inhibited by the receptor.

receptor/gene	ligands	activates	inhibits
RXFP1	relaxin-1, relaxin-2, relaxin-3	adenylate cyclase, protein kinase A, protein kinase C, phosphatidylinositol 3-kinase, extracellular signal-regulated kinases (Erk1/2)	
RXFP2	relaxin-1, relaxin-2, insulin-like 3	adenylate cyclase	
RXFP3	relaxin-3	Erk1/2 signaling	adenylate cyclase
RXFP4	insulin-like peptide 5, relaxin-3, bradykinin, kallidin		adenylate cyclase

== See also ==
- Relaxin family peptide hormones
- Insulin/IGF/Relaxin family
- Relaxin/insulin-like family peptide receptor 1
