= Insulin/IGF/Relaxin family =

Group of proteins

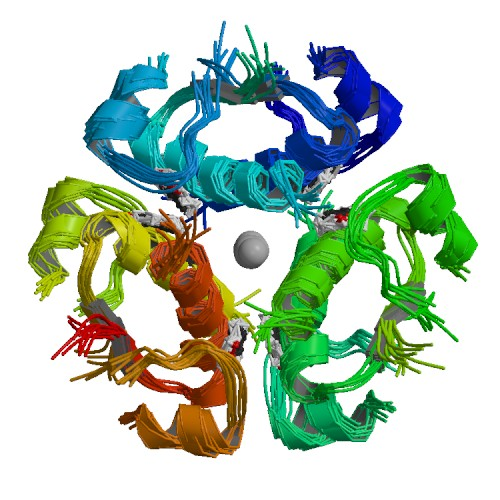
- PDB rendering based on 1ai0.

Identifiers
- Symbol: Insulin
- Pfam: PF00049
- Pfam clan: CL0239
- InterPro: IPR004825
- PROSITE: PDOC00235
- SCOP2: 1cph / SCOPe / SUPFAM
Available protein structures:
- PDB: 1a7f, 1ai0, 1aiy, 1aph, 1b17, 1b18, 1b19, 1b2a, 1b2b, 1b2c, 1b2d, 1b2e, 1b2f, 1b2g, 1b9e, 1b9g, 1ben, 1bom, 1bon, 1bph, 1bqt, 1cph, 1dei, 1dph, 1efe, 1ev3, 1ev6, 1evr, 1g7a, 1guj, 1gzr, 1gzy, 1gzz, 1h02, 1h59, 1hiq, 1his, 1hit, 1hls, 1ho0, 1htv, 1hui, 1igl, 1imx, 1iog, 1ioh, 1iza, 1izb, 1j73, 1jca, 1jco, 1k3m, 1kmf, 1lkq, 1lph, 1m5a, 1mhi, 1mhj, 1mpj, 1mso, 1os3, 1os4, 1pid, 1pmx, 1qiy, 1qiz, 1qj0, 1sdb, 1sf1, 1sjt, 1sju, 1t1k, 1t1p, 1t1q, 1tgr, 1trz, 1tyl, 1tym, 1vkt, 1wav, 1wqj, 1xda, 1xgl, 1zeg, 1zeh, 1zei, 1zni, 1znj, 2aiy, 2dsp, 2dsq, 2dsr, 2gf1, 2hiu, 2ins, 2tci, 3aiy, 3gf1, 3lri, 3mth, 4aiy, 4ins, 5aiy, 6rlx, 7ins, 9ins IPR004825 PF00049 (ECOD; PDBsum)
- AlphaFold: IPR004825; PF00049

The insulin/IGF/relaxin family is a group of evolutionarily related proteins which possess a variety of hormonal activities. In humans, these proteins are divided into two subsets:

1) insulin and insulin-like growth factors

2) relaxin family peptides:

- relaxins 1 and 2
- relaxin 3
- Leydig cell-specific insulin-like peptide (gene INSL3)
- early placenta insulin-like peptide (ELIP) (gene INSL4)
- insulin-like peptide 5 (gene INSL5)
- insulin-like peptide 6

== Structure ==
These proteins are characterized by having three disulfide bonds in a characteristic motif. Some family members have an additional disulfide bond also in a conserved location. All of these proteins have a helical segment (corresponding to B chain in insulin) followed by a variable-length chain, followed by a domain (A chain in insulin) with two helices pinned against each other via a disulfide bond. These two regions are linked by two or three disulfide bonds.

Amongst the different proteins in the family, very little of the sequence is conserved except for the disulfide bonds. The variable-length chains may exhibit large inter-species variation even when the remainder of the sequence is highly conserved; and as is in the case of insulin, sometimes the variable length chain is cleaved out by secretory endoproteases, leaving a two-chain protein held together by disulfide bonds.

== See also ==
- Relaxin/insulin-like family peptide receptor 1
