= Sacroiliac ligament =

Sacroiliac ligament can refer to:

- Anterior sacroiliac ligament (ligamentum sacroiliacum anterius)
- Interosseous sacroiliac ligament (ligamentum sacroiliacum interosseum)
- Posterior sacroiliac ligament (ligamentum sacroiliacum posterius)
