= Sacroiliac joint dysfunction =

Abnormal motion in the sacroiliac joint of the pelvis

- Other names: Sacroiliac joint disorder, sacroiliac joint disease, sacroiliac joint syndrome, sacroiliac syndrome, sacroilliac dysfunction and instability
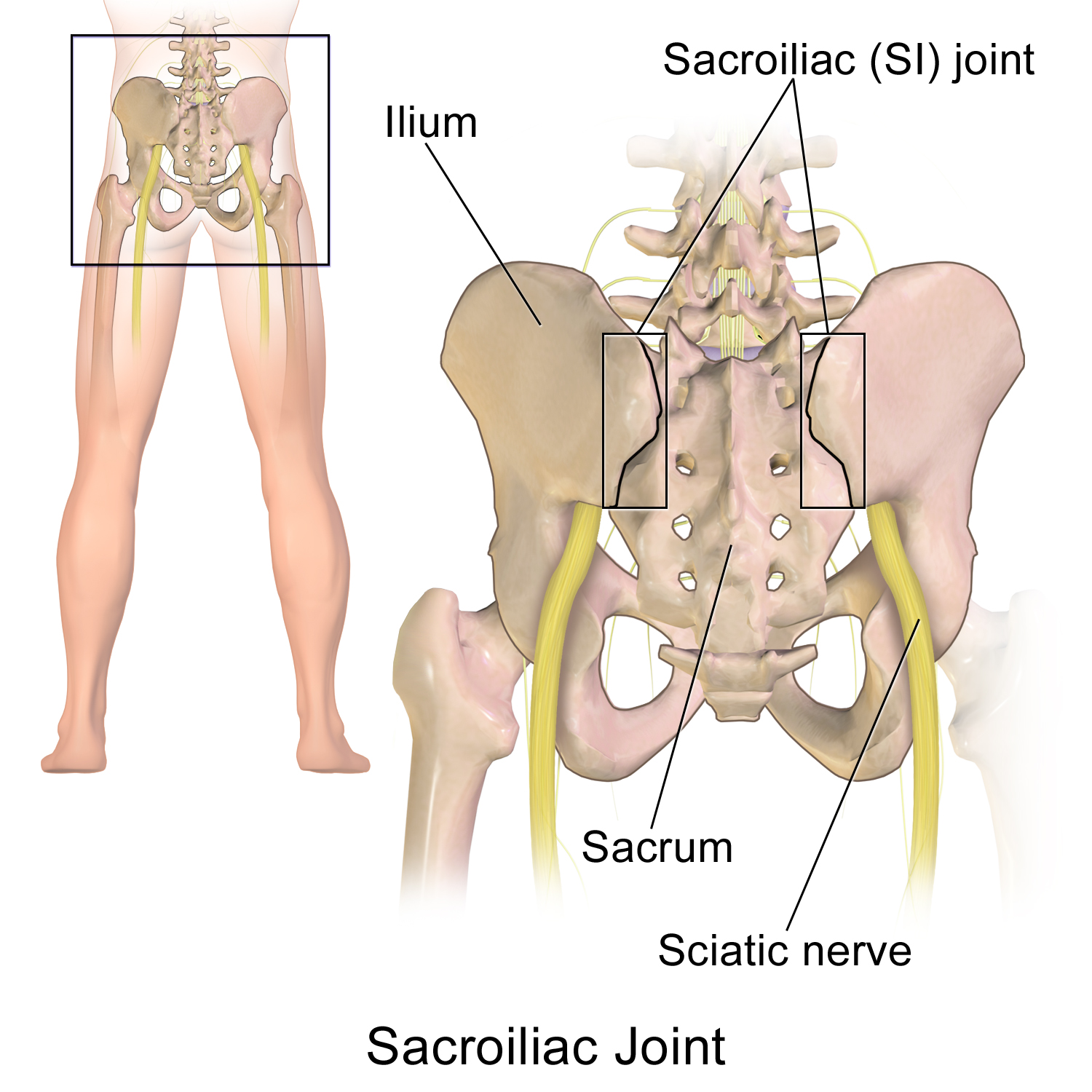
- The sacroiliac joint, posterior view

The term sacroiliac joint dysfunction refers to abnormal motion in the sacroiliac joint, either too much motion or too little motion, that causes pain in this region.

== Signs and symptoms ==
Common symptoms include lower back pain, buttocks pain, sciatic leg pain, groin pain, hip pain (for explanation of leg, groin, and hip pain, see referred pain), urinary frequency, and "transient numbness, prickling, or tingling". Pain can range from dull aching to sharp and stabbing and increases with physical activity. Symptoms also worsen with prolonged or sustained positions (i.e., sitting, standing, lying). Bending forward, stair climbing, hill climbing, and rising from a seated position can also provoke pain. Pain can increase during menstruation in women. People with severe and disabling sacroiliac joint dysfunction can develop insomnia and depression. Sacral rotation can be transmitted distally down the kinematic chain and, if left untreated over a long period of time, may lead to severe Achilles tendinitis.

== Causes ==
=== Hypermobility ===
Sacroiliac joint dysfunction is an outcome of either extra-articular dysfunction or from intraarticular dysfunction.

SI joint dysfunction is sometimes referred to as "sacroiliac joint instability" or "sacroiliac joint insufficiency" due to the support the once strong and taut ligaments can no longer sustain. When the joint is hypermobile or loose, it is classified as an extra-articular dysfunction because abnormal joint movement and alignment is a consequence of weakened, injured, or sprained ligaments, while the joint itself is structurally normal and healthy. The sacroiliac joint itself often will not show degenerative changes, such as arthritis, until many years of the dysfunction being allowed to continue. Injury to the ligaments that hold the sacroiliac joints in proper support is thought to be caused by a torsion or high impact injury (such as an automobile accident) or a hard fall, resulting in the hypermobility. As many as 58% of people diagnosed with sacroiliac joint pain had some inciting traumatic injury based on clinical examination findings. The joint that was once stabilized by strong ligaments, now overly stretched, sprained, or torn, will move beyond its normal range. This is thought to result in the ilium and sacral surfaces "locking" in an incongruent or asymmetrical fashion (one innominate bone is tilted anteriorly; the other innominate bone is tilted posteriorly) causing pain that can be debilitating.

Hormone imbalances, particularly those associated with pregnancy and the hormone relaxin, can also cause a ligamentous laxity resulting in the weakening of the sacroiliac structure. During pregnancy, relaxin serves as nature's way of allowing the female pelvis to achieve distention of the birthing canal. Pelvic joint pain in post pregnancy women is thought to be derived from the inability of the stretched out ligaments to return to normal tautness. Women who have delivered large babies or who have had extended labors also are prone to developing chronic sacroiliac joint pain and instability.

In some people, the sacroiliac joints reverse the normal concave-convex 'locking' relationship, which can lead to rotational misalignment. The variation in joint configuration results in some sacroiliac joints being inherently weaker or more prone to misalignment.

Certain biomechanical or muscle length imbalances may ultimately predispose a person to sacroiliac dysfunction and pain. Likely, this is a result of altered gait patterns and repetitive stress to the SI joint and related structures. These conditions exist in persons with leg-length inequality, scoliosis, a history of polio, poor-quality footwear, and hip osteoarthritis.

There is also a notable incidence of lumbar spinal fusion patients that present with sacroiliac pain and hypermobility, potentially due to the adjacent lumbar joints being fixed and unable to move. Clinical studies have found up to 75% of post-lumbar fusion patients develop SI joint degeneration within five years of surgery.

=== Hypomobility ===
Pathological hypomobility (too little movement) of the sacroiliac joint is an intra-articular disorder in which the joint locks due to wearing down with age or degenerative joint disease.

Hypomobility of this kind can also occur with an inflammatory disease such as ankylosing spondylitis, rheumatoid arthritis, or an infection.

== Pathophysiology ==
The sacroiliac joint is a true diarthrodial joint that joins the sacrum to the pelvis. The sacrum connects on the right and left sides to the ilia (pelvic bones) to form the sacroiliac joints. The pelvic girdle is made up of two innominate bones (the iliac bones) and the sacrum. The innominate bones join in the front of the pelvis to form the pubic symphysis, and at back of the sacrum to form the sacroiliac (SI) joints. Each innominate bone (ilium) joins the femur (thigh bone) to form the hip joint; thus the sacroiliac joint moves with walking and movement of the torso.

In this joint, hyaline cartilage on the sacral side moves against fibrocartilage on the iliac side. The sacroiliac joint contains numerous ridges and depressions that function in stability. Studies have documented that motion does occur at the joint; therefore, slightly subluxed and even locked positions can occur.

Muscles and ligaments surround and attach to the SI joint in the front and back, primarily on the ilial or sacral surfaces. These can all be a source of pain and inflammation if the SI joint is dysfunctional. The sacroiliac joint is highly dependent on its strong ligamentous structure for support and stability. The most commonly disrupted and/or torn ligaments are the iliolumbar ligament and the posterior sacroiliac ligament. The ligamentous structures offer resistance to shear and loading. The deep anterior, posterior, and interosseous ligaments resist the load of the sacrum relative to the ilium. More superficial ligaments (e.g., the sacrotuberous ligament) react to dynamic motions (such as straight-leg raising during physical motion). The long dorsal sacroiliac ligament can become stretched in periods of increased lumbar lordosis (e.g., during pregnancy).

=== Affected muscle groups ===
Many large and small muscles have relationships with the ligaments of the sacroiliac joint including the piriformis (see "piriformis syndrome", a condition often related with sacroiliac joint dysfunction), rectus femoris, gluteus maximus and minimus, erector spinae, latissimus dorsi, thoracolumbar fascia, and iliacus. Any of these muscles can be involved or spasm with a painful and dysfunctional sacroiliac joint. The SI joint is a pain-sensitive structure richly innervated by a combination of unmyelinated free nerve endings and the posterior primary rami of spinal segments L2-S3. The wide possibility of innervation may explain why pain originating from the joint can manifest in so many various ways, with different and unique referral patterns (see "referred pain") for individual patients. Patients with sacroiliac joint dysfunction can also develop tightness and dysfunction in the hamstring, quadriceps, iliotibial tract (see "iliotibial band syndrome") and hip flexors, including the psoas muscle. Individuals with severe and long-standing sacroiliac joint dysfunction can develop muscle deconditioning and atrophy throughout the body due to limitation of activities and exercise that bring about pain in the low back.

== Diagnosis ==
Perhaps the biggest reason for misdiagnosis or lack of diagnosis of sacroiliac joint dysfunction is based on the inability of common radiological imaging to discern the disorder. Diagnostic testing, such as X-ray, CT scan, or MRI, do not usually reveal abnormalities; therefore, they cannot reliably be used for diagnosis of sacroiliac joint dysfunction. There is a new imaging test SPECT/CT which can sometimes detect sacroiliac joint dysfunction. There is also a lack of evidence that sacroiliac joint mobility maneuvers (Gillet, Standing flexion test, and Seated Flexion test) detect motion abnormalities. Given the inherent technical limitations of the visible and palpable signs from these sacroiliac joint mobility maneuvers another broad category of clinical signs have been described called provocative maneuvers. These maneuvers are designed to reproduce or increase pain emanating within the sacroiliac joint.

A clinician (i.e., a spine surgeon, orthopedic surgeon, sports medicine doctor, athletic trainer, medical massage therapist, physical therapist, physiatrist, osteopath or chiropractor) can develop a probable diagnosis of sacroiliac joint dysfunction by using a hands on approach through palpating the painful areas and performing the following provocative maneuvers below:

- Gaenslen test - This pain provocation test applies torsion to the joint. With one hip flexed onto the abdomen, the other leg is allowed to dangle off the edge of the table. Pressure should then be directed downward on the leg in order to achieve hip extension and stress the sacroiliac joint.
- Iliac Gapping Test - Distraction can be performed to the anterior sacroiliac ligaments by applying pressure to the anterior superior iliac spine.
- Iliac Compression Test - Apply compression to the joint with the patient lying on his or her side. Pressure is applied downward to the uppermost iliac crest.
- FABER or Patrick test - To identify if pain may come from the sacroiliac joint during flexion, abduction, and external rotation, the clinician externally rotates the hip while the patient lies supine. Then, downward pressure is applied to the medial knee stressing both the hip and sacroiliac joint.
- Thigh Thrust - This test applies anteroposterior shear stress on the SI joint. The patient lies supine with one hip flexed to 90 degrees. The examiner stands on the same side as the flexed leg. The examiner provides either a quick thrust or steadily increasing pressure through the line of the femur. The pelvis is stabilized at the sacrum or at the opposite ASIS with the hand of the examiner

Cautious interpretation is warranted because there are no biomechanical studies showing that the Thigh Thrust test isolates forces in the SIJ when performed at 90 degrees and due to intra-individual variation in body type, hip flexibility, general flexibility of the trunk and pelvis. In all the tests, pain along the typical area raises suspicion for sacroiliac joint dysfunction. However no single test is very reliable in the diagnosis of sacroiliac joint dysfunction. It is important to remember true neurogenic weakness, numbness, or loss of reflex should alert the clinician to consider nerve root pathology.

The current "gold standard" for diagnosis of sacroiliac joint dysfunction emanating within the joint is sacroiliac joint injection confirmed under fluoroscopy or CT-guidance using a local anesthetic solution. The diagnosis is confirmed when the patient reports a significant change in relief from pain and the diagnostic injection is performed on two separate visits. Published studies have used at least a 75 percent change in relief of pain before a response is considered positive and the sacroiliac joint deemed the source of pain. However, several other injection studies have compared intra-articular with extra-articular injection, and indicate that the ligament injection behind the joint is oftentimes superior to injection in the joint and seems to be a very underutilized diagnostic tool.

=== Misdiagnosis ===
In the early 1900s, dysfunction of the sacroiliac joint was a common diagnosis associated with low back and sciatic nerve pain. However, research by Danforth and Wilson in 1925 concluded that the sacroiliac joint could not cause sciatic nerve pain because the joint does not have a canal in which the nerves can be entrapped against the joint. The biomechanical relationship between the sacroiliac joint, the piriformis muscle (see "piriformis syndrome"), and the sciatic nerve had not yet been discovered.

In 1934, the work of Mixter and Barr shifted all emphasis in research and treatment from the sacroiliac to the herniated intervertebral disc, namely lumbar discs. Medical focus on herniated discs was further forwarded by the invention of the MRI in 1977. Over-diagnosis and attention on herniated discs has led to the SI joint becoming an underappreciated pain generator in an estimated 15% to 25% of patients with axial low back pain.

The ligaments in the sacroiliac are among the strongest in the body and are not suspected by many clinicians to be susceptible to spraining or tearing. Skepticism of the existence of sacroiliac joint dysfunction within the medical community is furthered by the debate on how little or much the sacroiliac joint moves. A discrepancy as large as 2–17 degrees has been reported in clinical findings.

== Treatment ==
Treatment is often dependent on the duration and severity of the pain and dysfunction. In the acute phase (first 1–2 weeks) for a mild sprain of the sacroiliac, it is typical for the patient to be prescribed rest, ice/heat, spinal manipulation, and physical therapy; anti-inflammatory medicine can also be helpful.

If the pain does not resolve in the first 1–2 weeks, then the patient may benefit from a steroid and anesthetic mixture fluoroscopically injected into the joint (this also serves in confirming diagnosis), as well as manipulative or manual therapy. For the most severe and chronic forms of sacroiliac dysfunction, treatment should proceed with the support of a sacroiliac belt, injection therapy, and finally, surgery. The anti-inflammatory effect of injection therapy is not permanent, and the injections do not offer an opportunity to stabilize an incompetent joint. Surgery is often considered a last resort, but for some patients, it is the only method of effectively stabilizing the loose joint. A fixation of the joint (screws or similar hardware only, without the use of bone grafting) is more common than a spinal fusion, as it is much less invasive, surgically straightforward, and results in a quicker recovery time for the patient. Some experts in the field believe that it is important to make sure the sacroiliac joint is in an anatomically correct position prior to fixation or fusion, but published research contradicts this belief.

Platelet-rich plasma (PRP) injections have shown positive results as a treatment for Sacroiliac Joint Dysfunction, with randomized trials and case reports showing them to be more effective over periods of 3 months than steroid injections. Studies have also shown PRP injections into the sacroiliac joint are able to provide complete relief of symptoms, lasting as long as four years.

Dextrose prolotherapy injections performed either intraarticularly or into the dorsal sacroiliac ligaments is sometimes performed as an alternative treatment option. This is a controversial therapy but it does have research evidence to support its use. Kim et al. in 2010 published a randomized controlled trial evaluating the effect of intraarticular prolotherapy injections versus intraarticular steroid injections in proven sacroiliac joint pain. The two interventions were equal in the short term at 3 months, but the prolotherapy group had superior pain relief at the 15 month mark at the end of follow up. This type of trial is considered high level evidence in medical circles. Hoffman et al. in 2018 published a prospective cohort study with positive results in the treatment of those with sacroiliac joint dysfunction.

Muscle energy techniques (MET) are commonly used as part of conservative treatment for sacroiliac joint dysfunction. MET is a manual therapy intervention in which the patient performs controlled muscle contractions against resistance provided by the clinician to improve joint mobility and reduce musculoskeletal dysfunction. This approach is frequently used to address pelvic asymmetry and restore normal lumbopelvic mechanics. Recent research has evaluated the effectiveness of MET in individuals with sacroiliac joint dysfunction. A 2024 study assessing the use of muscle energy techniques demonstrated significant improvements in pain and functional outcomes following treatment. Theses findings support the use of MET as an effective non-invasive intervention in the management of sacroiliac joint dysfunction.

Exercise therapy for sacroiliac joint dysfunction typically focuses on improving lumbopelvic stability, strengthening core musculature, and enhancing neuromuscular control. Common approaches include strengthening of the gluteal muscles, abdominal stabilizers, and lumbar spine musculature, as well as stretching exercises targeting tight muscle groups around the pelvis and lower back. Exercises for the sacroiliac joint include sacroiliac joint self-mobilization, piriformis stretch, gluteus medius stretch, gluteus minimus stretch, gluteus maximus stretch. Also, a hip muscle isometric strengthening exercise that can be utilized is pushing your legs against each other on a pillow and pushing your legs toward your hand along with stretching. Lumbar exercises include knee to same shoulder stretch, hamstring stretch, quadriceps stretch, posterior pelvic tilt, conventional back-bridge as well with an elevated leg and a sit up.

Randomized controlled trials have shown that both sacroiliac joint-specific exercise programs and general lumbar stabilization exercises can significantly reduce pain and disability. Some evidence suggests that targeted sacroiliac exercises, when combined with manual therapy, may provide greater improvements in functional outcomes compared to lumbar exercises alone.

== See also ==
- Pelvic floor dysfunction
- Pelvic pain
- Sacroiliitis
