= Serelaxin =

Chemical compound

Clinical data
- Trade names: Reasanz
- Pregnancy category: N/A
- Routes of administration: Intravenous
- ATC code: C01DX21 (WHO)

Legal status
- Legal status: Investigational

Identifiers
- IUPAC name: L-Serine, L-α-aspartyl-L-seryl-L-tryptophyl-L-methionyl-L-α-glutamyl-L-α-glutamyl-L-valylL-isoleucyl-L-lysyl-L-leucyl-L-cysteinylglycyl-L-arginyl-L-α-glutamyl-L-leucyl-L-valyl-L- arginyl-L-alanyl-L-glutaminyl-L-isoleucyl-L-alanyl-L-isoleucyl-L-cysteinylglycyl-L- methionyl-L-seryl-L-threonyl-L-tryptophyl-, cyclic (11→11'),(23→24')-bis(disulfide) with 5-oxo-L-prolyl-L-leucyl-L-tyrosyl-L-seryl-L-alanyl-L-leucyl-L-alanyl-L-asparaginyl-L-lysyl-L- cysteinyl-L-cysteinyl-L-histidyl-L-valylglycyl-L-cysteinyl-L-threonyl-L-lysyl-L-arginyl-L- seryl-L-leucyl-L-alanyl-L-arginyl-L-phenylalanyl-L-cysteine cyclic (10'→15')-disulfide
- CAS Number: 99489-94-8
- ChemSpider: none
- UNII: W0122B976Y
- KEGG: D10488
- CompTox Dashboard (EPA): DTXSID40244082

Chemical and physical data
- Formula: C_{256}H_{408}N_{74}O_{74}S_{8}
- Molar mass: 5963.00 g·mol^{−1}

Serelaxin (brand name Reasanz; developmental code name RLX-030) is a medication which is marketed in Russia for the treatment of acute heart failure (AHF), targeting the relaxin receptor. It was also under development in other places in the world, including in the United States, Europe, and Asia, but ultimately was not marketed in these areas.

Serelaxin is a recombinant form of human relaxin-2, a hormone that (among other functions) is produced during pregnancy and mediates the haemodynamic changes that occur during this time, such as increased blood output of the heart and blood flow in the kidney. Human-relaxin-2 mediates vasodilation (widening of blood vessels) by increasing the production of nitric oxide (NO), a potent vasodilator. Activation of the relaxin receptor RXFP1 activates several enzymes in a phosphorylation cascade that eventually results in the activation of NO synthase in endothelial cells and the subsequent production of NO. Relaxin can also bind to a secondary receptor, endothelial B receptor, which is upregulated as a result of the previous pathway. Relaxin binding to endothelial B receptor on endothelial cells also induces vasodilation.

Relaxin causes vasodilation by an indirect mechanism, where it inhibits the potent vasoconstrictors angiotensin II and endothelin. In addition to vasodilation, the effects of relaxin are also seen in the kidneys, by significantly increasing creatinine clearance, which is a measure of kidney function, as well as increased renal blood flow. Relaxin also functions as a cardiac stimulant. Studies have demonstrated that relaxin increases calcium sensitivity of cardiac myofilaments as well as increasing phosphorylation of the myofilaments by protein kinase C (PKC). These modifications both function to increase the force generated by the myofilaments without increasing the energy consumption of the cardiac myocytes. Thus relaxin and serelaxin can increase stroke volume, the amount of blood pumped per heart beat, without increasing the energy demand on the already strained heart of acute heart failure patients.

== Acute heart failure ==
Serelaxin has undergone clinical trials in patients with acute heart failure, conducted by Novartis. Serelaxin has completed several clinical trials as a therapy for AHF. Phase I trials examined safety and tolerability, while phase II trials evaluated its haemodynamic effects and symptom relief. The Pre-RELAX-AHF phase II trial administered a dose of 30 μg/kg/day and showed a decrease in blood pressure, improved dyspnoea, and increased renal blood flow. In phase III the RELAX-AHF trial gave a 48hr intravenous infusion of the same dose. It significantly improved patients' dyspnoea, resulted in a 30% reduction in worsening of heart failure symptoms, a decreased hospital stay and a reduction in signs and symptoms of congestion. The FDA granted serelaxin "breakthrough therapy" designation, meant to expedite the development and review of drugs for life-threatening conditions. On 22 March 2017, Novartis announced that the global Phase III study of serelaxin in patients with acute heart failure did not meet its primary endpoints.
