= Sacroiliac joint =

Joint of the pelvis and spine

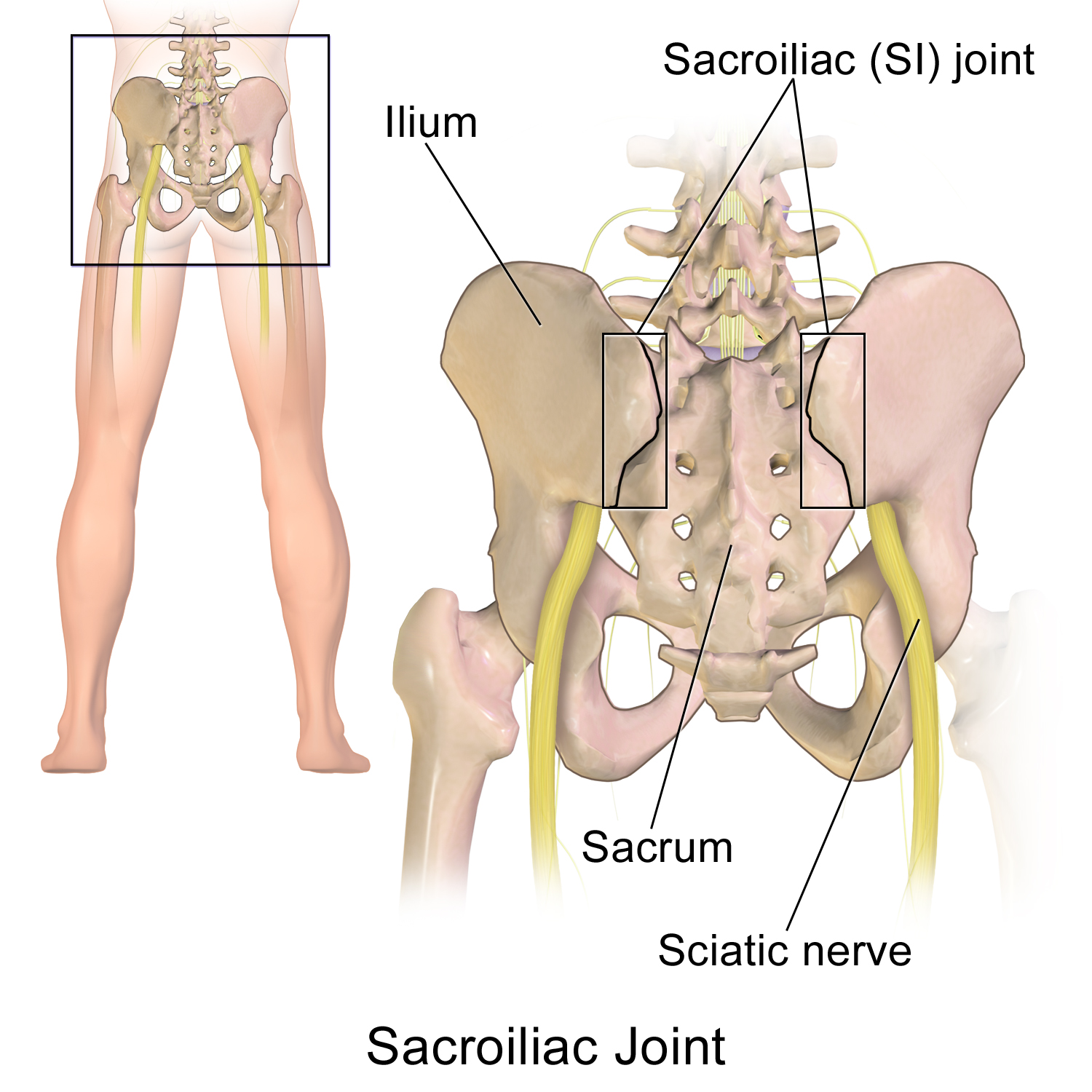
- Sacroiliac joint of the male pelvis, posterior view

- Human female pelvis, anterior view, with sacroiliac joint within red ellipse.

Details

Identifiers
- Latin: articulatio sacroiliaca
- MeSH: D012446
- TA98: A03.6.03.001
- TA2: 1861
- FMA: 21440

The sacroiliac joint or SI joint (SIJ) is the joint between the sacrum and the ilium bones of the pelvis, which are connected by strong ligaments. In humans, the sacrum supports the spine and is supported in turn by an ilium on each side. The joint is strong, supporting the entire weight of the upper body. It is a synovial plane joint with irregular elevations and depressions that produce interlocking of the two bones. The human body has two sacroiliac joints, one on the left and one on the right, that often match each other but are highly variable from person to person.

== Structure ==
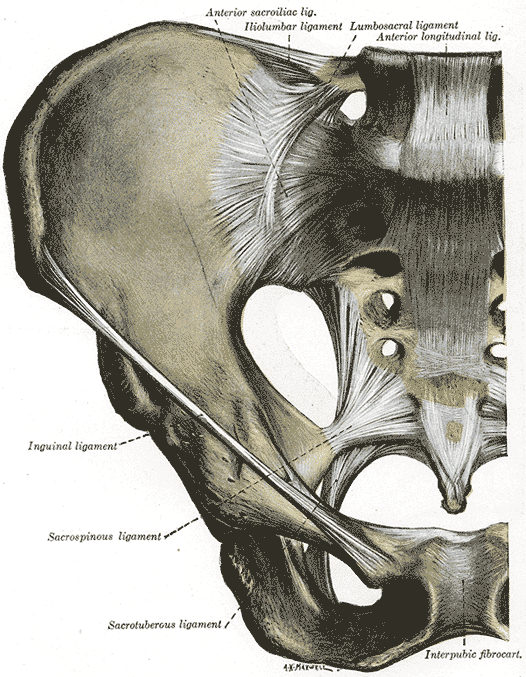
Articulations of pelvis. Anterior view.

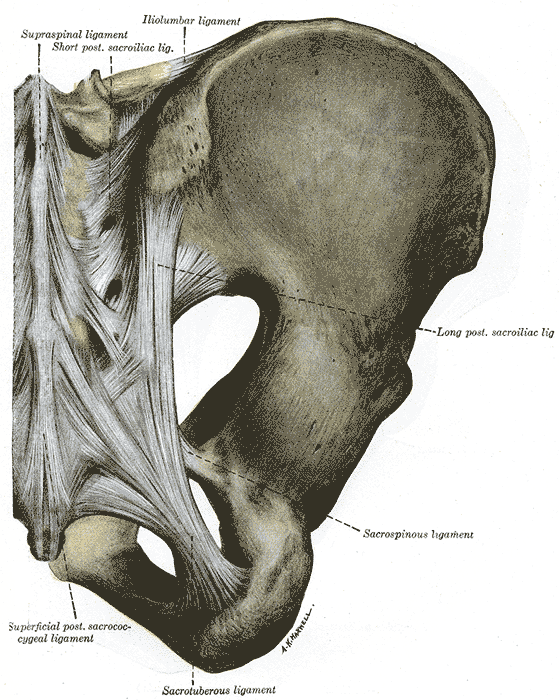
Articulations of pelvis. Posterior view.

Sacroiliac joints are paired C-shaped or L-shaped joints capable of a small amount of movement (2–18 degrees, which is debatable at this time) that are formed between the articular surfaces of the sacrum and the ilium bones. However, most agree that only slight movements occur on these joints, with only 3 degrees range of motion during flexion-extension, followed by 1.5 degrees axial rotation, and 0.8 degrees lateral bending. The joints are covered by two different kinds of cartilage; the sacral surface has hyaline cartilage and the iliac surface has fibrocartilage. The SIJ's stability is maintained mainly through a combination of only some bony structure and very strong intrinsic and extrinsic ligaments. The joint space is usually 0.5 to 4 mm.

Aging changes the characteristics of the sacroiliac joint. The joint's surfaces are flat or planar in early life. Once walking ability is developed, the sacroiliac joint surfaces begin to develop distinct angular orientations and lose their planar or flat topography. They also develop an elevated ridge along the iliac surface and a depression along the sacral surface. The ridge and corresponding depression, along with the very strong ligaments, increase the sacroiliac joints' stability and makes dislocations very rare. The fossae lumbales laterales ("dimples of Venus") correspond to the superficial topography of the sacroiliac joints.

=== Ligaments ===
The ligaments of the sacroiliac joint include the following:

- Anterior sacroiliac ligament
- Interosseous sacroiliac ligament
- Posterior sacroiliac ligament
- Sacrotuberous ligament
- Sacrospinous ligament

The anterior sacroiliac ligament is relatively thin, often appearing as a slight thickening of the anterior joint capsule, and is less well defined than other sacroiliac ligaments.

The posterior sacroiliac (SI) ligaments can be further divided into short (intrinsic) and long (extrinsic). The dorsal interosseous ligaments are very strong, and in some cases pelvic fractures may occur before the ligaments tear. The dorsal sacroiliac ligaments include both long and short ligaments. The long dorsal sacroiliac joint ligaments run in an oblique vertical direction while the short (interosseous) runs perpendicular from just behind the articular surfaces of the sacrum to the ilium and functions to keep the sacroiliac joint from distracting or opening. The sacrotuberous and sacrospinous ligaments (also known as the extrinsic sacroiliac joint ligaments) limit the amount the sacrum flexes.

The ligaments of the sacroiliac joint loosen during pregnancy due to the hormone relaxin; this loosening, along with that of the related symphysis pubis, permits the pelvic joints to widen during the birthing process. The long SI ligaments may be palpated in thin persons for pain and compared from one side of the body to the other; however, the reliability and the validity of comparing ligaments for pain have currently not been shown. The interosseous ligaments are very short and run perpendicular from the iliac surface to the sacrum, they keep the articular surfaces from abducting or opening/distracting.

== Function ==
Like most lower extremity joints, one of the SI joints' functions is shock absorption (depending on the amount of available motion at the sacroiliac joint) for the spine, along with the job of torque conversion allowing the transverse rotations that take place in the lower extremity to be transmitted up the spine. The SI joint, like all lower extremity joints, provides a "self-locking" mechanism (where the joint occupies or attains its most congruent position, also called the close pack position) that helps with stability during the push-off phase of walking. The joint locks (or rather becomes close packed) on one side as weight is transferred from one leg to the other, and through the pelvis the body weight is transmitted from the sacrum to the hip bone.

The motions of the sacroiliac joint

- Anterior innominate tilt of both hip bones on the sacrum (where the left and right move as a unit)
- Posterior innominate tilt of both hip bones on the sacrum (where the left and right move together as a unit)
- Anterior innominate tilt of one innominate bone while the opposite innominate bone tilts posteriorly on the sacrum (antagonistic innominate tilt) which occurs during gait
- Sacral flexion (or nutation) Motions of the sacrum occur simultaneous with motion of the ilium so you must be careful in the description of these as isolated motions.
- Sacral extension (or counter-nutation).

The sacroiliac joints like all spinal joints (except the atlanto-axial) are bicondylar joints, meaning that movement of one side corresponds to a correlative movement of the other side.

== Clinical significance ==
=== Inflammation and dysfunction ===
Sacroiliitis refers to inflammation of one or both sacroiliac joints, and is one cause of low back pain. With sacroiliitis, the individual may experience pain in the low back, buttock or thigh.

Common mechanical problems of the sacroiliac joint are often called sacroiliac joint dysfunction (also termed SI joint dysfunction; SIJD). Sacroiliac joint dysfunction generally refers to pain in the sacroiliac joint region that is caused by abnormal motion in the sacroiliac joint—either too much or too little motion.It typically results in inflammation of the SI joint, or sacroiliitis.

=== Signs and symptoms ===
The following are signs and symptoms that may be associated with an SI joint (SIJ) problem:

- Mechanical SIJ dysfunction usually causes a dull unilateral low back pain.
- The pain is often a mild to moderate ache around the dimple or posterior superior iliac spine (PSIS) region.
- The pain may become worse and sharp while doing activities such as standing up from a seated position or lifting the knee towards the chest during stair climbing.
- Pain is typically on one side or the other (unilateral PSIS pain), but the pain can occasionally be bilateral.
- When the pain of SIJ dysfunction is severe (which is infrequent), there can be referred pain into the hip, groin, and occasionally down the leg, but rarely does the pain radiate below the knee.
- Pain can be referred from the SIJ down into the buttock or back of the thigh, and rarely to the foot.
- Low back pain and stiffness, often unilateral, that often increases with prolonged sitting or prolonged walking.
- Pain may occur during sexual intercourse; however, this is not specific to just sacroiliac joint problems.

Sacroiliac joint dysfunction is tested using provocative and nonprovocative maneuvers. Nonprovocative sacroiliac joint examination maneuvers would include Gillet Test, prone knee flexion test, supine long sitting test, standing flexion test, and seated flexion test. There is a lack of evidence that these sacroiliac joint mobility maneuvers detect motion abnormalities.

Given the inherent technical limitations of the visible and palpable signs from these sacroiliac joint mobility maneuvers, another broad category of clinical signs has been described called provocative maneuvers. These maneuvers are designed to reproduce or increase pain originating from within the sacroiliac joint. When the provocative maneuvers reproduce pain along the typical area, it raises suspicion for sacroiliac joint dysfunction. However no single test is very reliable in diagnosing of sacroiliac joint dysfunction. Weakness, numbness, or the loss of a related reflex may indicate nervous system damage.

The current gold standard for diagnosis of sacroiliac joint dysfunction emanating within the joint is sacroiliac joint injection confirmed under fluoroscopy or CT-guidance using a local anesthetic solution. The diagnosis is confirmed when the patient reports a significant change in relief from pain and the diagnostic injection is performed on 2 separate visits. Published studies have used at least a 75 percent change in relief of pain before a response is considered positive and the sacroiliac joint deemed the source of pain.

=== Pregnancy ===
The hormonal changes of menstruation, pregnancy, and lactation can affect the integrity of the ligament support around the SIJ, which is why women often find the days leading up to their period are when the pain is at its worst. During pregnancy, female hormones are released that allow the connective tissues in the body to relax. The relaxation is necessary so that during delivery, the female pelvis can stretch enough to allow birth. This stretching results in changes to the SIJs, making them overly mobile. Over a period of years, these changes can eventually lead to wear-and-tear arthritis. As would be expected, the more pregnancies a woman has, the higher her chances of SI joint problems. During the pregnancy, micro tears and small gas pockets can appear within the joint.

Muscle imbalance, trauma (e.g., falling on the buttock) and hormonal changes can all lead to SIJ dysfunction. Sacroiliac joint pain may be felt anteriorly, however, care must be taken to differentiate this from hip joint pain.

Women are considered more likely to suffer from sacroiliac pain than men, mostly because of structural and hormonal differences between the sexes, but so far no credible evidence exists that confirms this notion. Female anatomy often allows one fewer sacral segment to lock with the pelvis, and this may increase instability.

== Additional images ==
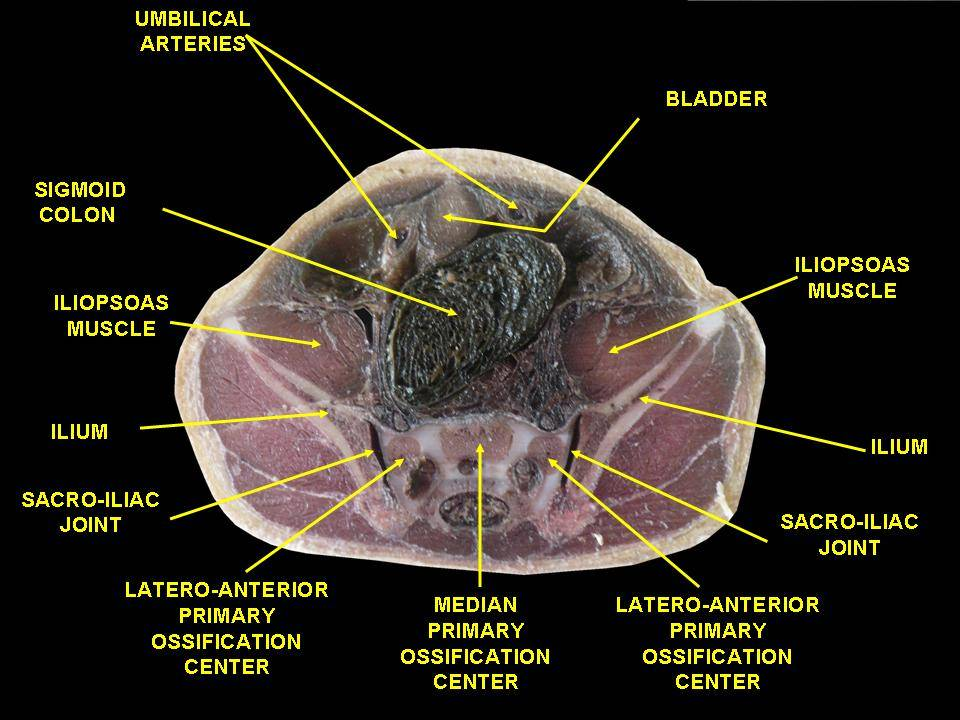
Sacroiliac joint. Deep dissection. Serial cross section.

== See also ==
- Dimples of Venus – Depressions over the gluteal fold
- Sacroiliac joint dysfunction – Abnormal motion in the sacroiliac joint of the pelvis
- Surgery for the dysfunctional sacroiliac joint
- Piriformis syndrome
- Ankylosing spondylitis – Type of arthritis of the spine
