= EPCIP (gene) =

Protein-coding gene in the species Homo sapiens

Identifiers
- Aliases: EPCIP, B37, C21orf120, PRED81, chromosome 21 open reading frame 62, C21orf62
- External IDs: MGI: 1921637; HomoloGene: 49594; GeneCards: EPCIP; OMA:EPCIP - orthologs

Gene location (Human)
Chr.	Chromosome 21 (human)
Band	21q22.11	Start	32,790,673 bp
Band	21q22.11	End	32,813,743 bp

Gene location (Mouse)
Chr.	Chromosome 16 (mouse)
Band	16|16 C3.3	Start	91,053,935 bp
Band	16|16 C3.3	End	91,095,122 bp
RNA expression pattern
Bgee	Human / Mouse (ortholog); Top expressed in: ovary; left ovary; testicle; right ovary; human kidney; anterior pituitary; corpus callosum; body of pancreas; hypothalamus; islet of Langerhans / Top expressed in: spermatid; embryo; embryo; pretectal area; zygote; dentate gyrus of hippocampal formation granule cell; spermatocyte; primary visual cortex; surface ectoderm; lens; More reference expression data
BioGPS	n/a
Gene ontology
Molecular function	molecular function
Cellular component	cellular component
Biological process	biological process
Sources:Amigo / QuickGO
Orthologs
Species	Human	Mouse
Entrez	56245	74387
Ensembl	ENSG00000262938; ENSG00000205929	ENSMUSG00000039851
UniProt	Q9NYP8	Q9D4G1
RefSeq (mRNA)	NM_001162495; NM_001162496; NM_019596	NM_001163695; NM_028905
RefSeq (protein)	NP_001155967; NP_001155968; NP_062542	NP_001157167; NP_083181
Location (UCSC)	Chr 21: 32.79 – 32.81 Mb	Chr 16: 91.05 – 91.1 Mb
PubMed search
- Wikidata
View/Edit Human	View/Edit Mouse

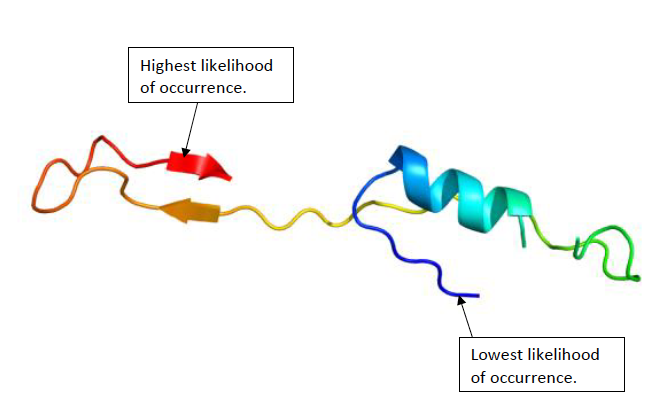
Figure 1.

Exosomal polycystin-1-interacting protein is a protein that, in humans, is encoded by the EPCIP gene. EPCIP is found on human chromosome 21, and it is thought to be expressed in tissues of the brain and reproductive organs. Additionally, EPCIP is highly expressed in ovarian surface epithelial cells during normal regulation, but is not expressed in cancerous ovarian surface epithelial cells.

== Gene ==
Common aliases of EPCIP are C21orf62, C21orf120, PRED81, and B37. EPCIP is located on chromosome 21 in humans, and is specifically at the q22.11 position. The EPCIP gene is 4132 base pairs in length and contains five exons.

== mRNA ==
The mRNA sequence of EPCIP in humans has one known isoform. This isoform is called uncharacterized protein C21orf62 isoform X1. This isoform is 458 base pairs, or 104 amino acids, in length, and it is significantly shorter than the most observed sequence of EPCIP in humans. In addition to having an isoform, EPCIP also has splice variants. All splice variants encode the same gene, but the differences in splice variant sequences occur in the 5' untranslated region of the mRNA sequence.

== Protein ==
=== General protein characteristics ===
The EPCIP protein in humans has a sequence that is 219 amino acids in length. The primary sequence of EPCIP in humans has a molecular weight of 24.9 kDa and an isoelectric point of 8. When it's cleavable signal peptide, which spans amino acids 1-19, is removed, it has a molecular weight of 22.8 kDa and an isoelectric point of 7.8.

=== Protein composition ===
EPCIP in humans has higher cysteine and lower valine concentrations than expected compared to other human proteins. This trend, as showed in Table 1, is the same for other mammals. It does not, however, occur in taxa other than mammalia.

Table 1. Unusual amino acid concentrations of EPCIP in humans and orthologs.
Genus and species	Common name	Organism Clade	% Cysteine	Amino Acid Concentration of Cysteine Compared to Expected	% Valine	Amino Acid Concentration of Valine Compared to Expected	Other Amino Acids with High or Low Concentration Compared to Expected
Homo sapiens	Human	Mammalia	4.6%	High	3.2%	Low	-
Mus musculus	House Mouse	Mammalia	4.3%	High	3.5%	Low	Glutamic Acid (1.7%, low)
Canis lupus familiaris	Dog	Mammalia	4.1%	High	2.7%	Low	Leucine (14.2%, high)
Physeter catodon	Sperm Whale	Mammalia	4.6%	High	4.1%	Expected	Serine (11.9%, high)
Gallus gallus	Chicken	Aves	3.1%	Expected	6.7%	Expected	Alanine (2.2%, low) Glycine (3.1%, low) Proline (1.8%, low) Phenylalanine (7.1%, high) Serine (12.4%, high) Threonine (9.8%)
Chelonia mydas	Green Sea Turtle	Reptilia	3.6%	Expected	5.8%	Expected	Alanine (1.8%, low) Serine (11.2%, high)

=== Protein structure ===
The protein structure of EPCIP in humans consists of a combination of alpha helices and beta sheets. Figure 1 shows a predicted structure of the protein.

=== Post-translational modifications ===
EPCIP has a myristoylation site from amino acid 26–31. It has a sumoylation site from amino acid 132–135. Additionally, it has a nuclear export signal from amino acid 98-104.

== Expression ==
=== Tissue expression ===
EPCIP is expressed in human tissues of the brain and reproductive organs.

=== Expression level ===
EPCIP in humans is moderately expressed in the brain, kidneys, pancreas, prostate, testes, and ovaries.

=== Regulation of expression ===
EPCIP is expressed during blastocyst, fetus, and adult states of human development. It is overexpressed during some tumor states, including pancreatic, gastrointestinal, germ cell, and glioma tumors.

== Function ==
The specific function of EPCIP in humans is not yet well understood.

== Interacting proteins ==
EPCIP is thought to potentially interact with nine other proteins. These interactions are shown in Table 2, and they were found through text mining.

Table 2. Proteins with Evidence of Interaction with EPCIP
Protein Full Name	Protein Name Symbol	Brief Protein Description
BCL2 Interacting Protein Like	BNIPL	May function as a bridge molecule that promotes cell death.
Thymosin Beta 4, X-linked Pseudogene 4	TMSB4XP4	Potentially influences actin polymerization.
Synovial Sarcoma X Family Member 4	SSX4	May function as a repressor of transcription, and can be useful targets in cancer vaccine-based immunotherapy.
Crystallin Beta A2	CRYBA2	A major protein in vertebrate eyes that maintains lens transparency and reflective index.
Oral Cancer Overexpressed 1	ORAOV1	A gene that is frequently overexpressed in esophageal squamous cell cancer.
Oligodendrocyte Transcription Factor 1	OLIG1	May be expressed during the time from process extension through membrane maintenance in oligodendrocytes.
PAX3 and PAX7 Binding Protein 1	GCFC1 (PAXBP1)	The encoded protein potentially binds to GC-rich DNA sequences. It is suggested that this gene is involved in the regulation of transcription.
Relaxin/Insulin Like Family Peptide Receptor 1 and 2	RXFP1 and RXFP2	Encoded protein is a receptor for the protein hormone relaxin that influences sperm motility and pregnancy.

== Clinical significance ==
EPCIP over or under expression is linked to some types of cancerous cells and tumors.

== Homology ==
=== Paralogs ===
There are no known paralogs of EPCIP in humans at this time.

=== Orthologs ===
There are currently 193 organisms that are known to be orthologs of EPCIP. The orthologs of EPCIP are deuterostome animals in the clade Chordata. Table 3 shows a range of EPCIP orthologs, their NCBI accession numbers, sequence lengths, and sequence identity to the EPCIP human protein. At this time, EPCIP is not known to have any protostome or invertebrate orthologs.

Table 3. Orthologs of Human Protein EPCIP
Genus and species	Common name	Organism Clade	Estimated Date of Divergence from Humans (Millions of Years Ago)	Accession number	Amino Acid Sequence Length	Corrected Sequence Identity to Human Protein
Homo sapiens	Human	mammalia	0	NP_001155967.2	219	100%
Mus musculus	House Mouse	mammalia	90	NP_083181.1	230	68.2%
Meleagris gallopavo	Wild Turkey	aves	312	XP_010721230.1	225	56.4%
Chelonia mydas	Green Sea Turtle	reptilia	312	XP_007063646.1	224	60.8%
Xenopus tropicalis	Western Clawed Frog	tetrapoda	352	NP_001004889.1	207	48.9%
Latimeria chalumnae	West Indian Ocean Coelacanth	sarcopterygii	413	XP_005993681.2	237	45.0%
Ictalurus punctatus	Channel Catfish	actinopterygii	435	XP_017326002.1	214	29.6%
Callorhinchus milii	Australian Ghostshark	condrichthyes	473	XP_007904174.1	222	40.4%

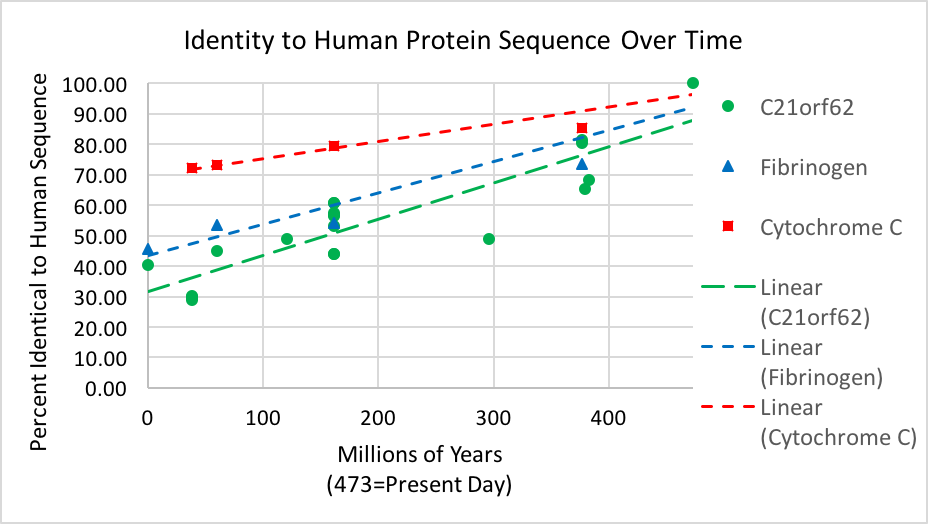
Figure 2. Evolution of EPCIP in humans over time.

=== Evolution rate ===
EPCIP has an evolution rate that is faster than cytochrome C and fibrinogen. Figure 2 shows the rate of evolution of the EPCIP gene over the past 473 million years.
