= Sacroiliac joint pain =

Sacroiliac joint pain or sacroiliac joint sprain are terms that may refer to:

- Sacroiliitis, an inflammation of the sacroiliac joint that causes pain
- Sacroiliac joint dysfunction, abnormal motion in the sacroiliac joint that causes pain
