= Relaxin =

Protein hormone

RLN2

Identifiers
- Aliases: RLN2, H2, H2-RLX, RLXH2, bA12D24.1.1, bA12D24.1.2, relaxin 2, Ovarian relaxin of pregnancy
- External IDs: OMIM: 179740; MGI: 97931; GeneCards: RLN2
Available structures
PDB	Ortholog search: PDBe RCSB
PDB	List of PDB id codes 2MV1, 6RLX

Gene location (Human)
Chr.	Chromosome 9 (human)
Band	9p24.1	Start	5,299,864 bp
Band	9p24.1	End	5,304,716 bp

Gene location (Mouse)
Chr.	Chromosome 19 (mouse)
Band	19 C1|19 23.83 cM	Start	29,308,570 bp
Band	19 C1|19 23.83 cM	End	29,312,070 bp
RNA expression pattern
Bgee	Human / Mouse (ortholog); Top expressed in: testicle; gonad; islet of Langerhans; right uterine tube; pituitary gland; anterior pituitary; granulocyte; lymph node; olfactory zone of nasal mucosa; pancreatic ductal cell / Top expressed in: embryo; embryo; entorhinal cortex; choroid plexus of fourth ventricle; dentate gyrus of hippocampal formation granule cell; CA3 field; perirhinal cortex; suprachiasmatic nucleus; neural tube; superior frontal gyrus; More reference expression data
BioGPS	n/a
Gene ontology
Molecular function	hormone activity
Cellular component	extracellular region
Biological process	female pregnancy; positive regulation of gene expression; positive regulation of angiogenesis; regulation of catalytic activity; regulation of signaling receptor activity; G protein-coupled receptor signaling pathway
Sources:Amigo / QuickGO
Orthologs
Databases	NCBI: entry; OMA: entry
Species	Human	Mouse
Entrez	6019	19773
Ensembl	ENSG00000107014	ENSMUSG00000039097
UniProt	P04090	P47932
RefSeq (mRNA)	NM_005059; NM_134441; NM_001329191	NM_011272
RefSeq (protein)	NP_001316120; NP_005050; NP_604390	NP_035402
Location (UCSC)	Chr 9: 5.3 – 5.3 Mb	Chr 19: 29.31 – 29.31 Mb
PubMed search
- Wikidata
View/Edit Human	View/Edit Mouse

Relaxin 1
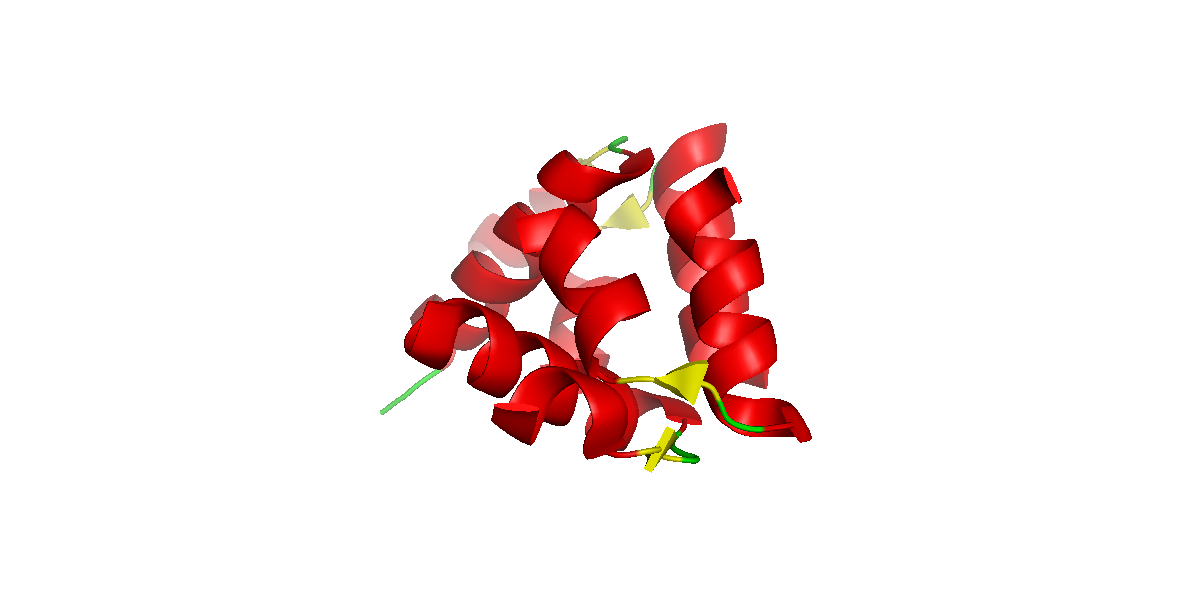

Identifiers
- Symbol: RLN1
- Alt. symbols: H1
- NCBI gene: 6013
- HGNC: 10026
- OMIM: 179730
- RefSeq: NM_006911
- UniProt: P04808

Other data
- Locus: Chr. 9 qter-q12
Search for
- Structures: Swiss-model
- Domains: InterPro

Relaxin 3

Identifiers
- Symbol: RLN3
- Alt. symbols: ZINS4, RXN3, H3
- NCBI gene: 117579
- HGNC: 17135
- OMIM: 606855
- RefSeq: NM_080864
- UniProt: Q8WXF3

Other data
- Locus: Chr. 19 p13.3
Search for
- Structures: Swiss-model
- Domains: InterPro

Relaxin is a peptide hormone that in humans is encoded by the gene RLN2. During pregnancy, this hormone is secreted by the ovaries and functions to regulate blood pressure, and soften the tissues of the birth canal in preparation of childbirth. This pregnancy-associated hormone is also called relaxin-2 in humans, and relaxin-1 in non-primate mammals (who do not have a separate relaxin-2).

The closely related human hormone, relaxin-1, activates the same receptors as relaxin/relaxin-2 but is produced in the prostate. Nevertheless, it is sometimes also referred to as relaxin.

More broadly, the relaxin family peptide hormones belong to the insulin superfamily and consist of seven peptides of high structural but low sequence similarity; relaxin-1 (RLN1), 2 (RLN2) and 3 (RLN3), and the insulin-like (INSL) peptides, INSL3, INSL4, INSL5 and INSL6. Despite its name, relaxin-3 is most closely related to INSL5, and appears to function as a neuropeptide.

== Discovery ==
The roughly 6000 Da. relaxin was first described in 1926 by Frederick Hisaw.

== Synthesis ==
In the female, relaxin is produced by the corpus luteum of the ovary, the breast and, during pregnancy, also by the placenta, chorion, and decidua. In the male, it is produced in the prostate and is present in human semen.

== Structure ==
Structurally, relaxin is a heterodimer of two peptide chains of 24 and 29 amino acids linked by three disulfide bridges, and it appears related to insulin.

Relaxin is produced from its prohormone, "prorelaxin", by post-translational proteolytic cleavage of its signal peptide and C domain peptide.

== Function in humans ==
=== Reproduction ===
In females, relaxin is produced mainly by the corpus luteum, in both pregnant and nonpregnant females. Relaxin levels rise to a peak within approximately 14 days of ovulation, and then decline in the absence of pregnancy, resulting in menstruation. Relaxin may be involved in the vital process of decidualisation, working alongside steroid hormones to allow the endometrium to prepare for implantation. During the first trimester of pregnancy, levels rise and additional relaxin is produced by the decidua. Blood plasma levels of relaxin peak during the first trimester (8-12 weeks) at 1.2 ng/mL and subsequently drop following demise of the corpus luteum. In pregnancy, relaxin mediates the hemodynamic changes that occur such as increased cardiac output and increased renal blood flow.

Relaxin is believed to relax the uterine muscle and to loosen the ligaments holding the pelvic bones together, in order to prepare the birth canal for the birth. It may cause a woman to feel that other ligaments are looser, such as in the shoulders, knees, hips, and ankles.

In males, relaxin enhances motility of sperm in semen. Also, relaxin is found in higher than normal concentrations in the ejaculate of men who were born without their vas deferens and seminal vesicles.

=== Cardiovascular function ===
In the cardiovascular system, relaxin is secreted by the heart and functions as a vasodilator mainly through the nitric oxide pathway. Other mechanisms include activation of NFκB leading to vascular endothelial growth factor (VEGF), activation of PI3K/Akt-associated signaling pathways, and matrix metalloproteinases transcription. In ex vivo experiments using subcutaneous resistance arteries, relaxin has shown to be a powerful endothelium-dependent vasodilator.

Via upregulation of VEGF, relaxin also plays a key role in blood vessel formation (angiogenesis) during pregnancy, tumour development or ischaemic wounds.

== Function in other animals ==
=== Reproduction ===
In animals, relaxin widens the pubic bone and facilitates labor; it also softens the cervix (cervical ripening), and softens the pubic symphysis in rat and guinea pig models. Thus, for a long time, relaxin was looked at as a pregnancy hormone. However, its significance may reach much further. Relaxin may affect collagen metabolism, inhibiting collagen synthesis and enhancing its breakdown by increasing matrix metalloproteinases. It also enhances angiogenesis and is a potent renal vasodilator.

In horses (Equus caballus), relaxin is also an important hormone involved in pregnancy; however, before pregnancy occurs, relaxin is expressed by ovarian structures during the oestrous cycle. Prior to ovulation, relaxin will be produced by ovarian stromal cells, which will promote secretion of gelatinases and tissue inhibitors of metalloproteinases. These enzymes will then aid the process of ovulation, which will lead to the release of a developed follicle into the fallopian tube. Furthermore, granular and theca cells in the follicles will express relaxin in increasing levels depending on their size. During early pregnancy, the preimplantation conceptus will express relaxin, which will promote angiogenesis in the endometrium by up-regulating VEGF. This will allow the endometrium to prepare for implantation. In horses alone, the embryo in the uterus will express relaxin mRNA at least 8 days after ovulation. Then as the conceptus develops expression will increase, which is likely to promote embryo development.

In addition to relaxin production by the horse embryo, the maternal placenta is the main source of relaxin production, whereas in most animals the main source of relaxin is the corpus luteum. Placental trophoblast cells produce relaxin, however, the size of the placenta does not determine the level of relaxin production. This is seen because different breeds of horses show different relaxin levels. From 80 day of gestation onwards, relaxin levels will increase in the mare's serum with levels peaking in late gestation. Moreover, the pattern of relaxin expression will follow the expression of oestrogen, however, there is not yet a known link between these two hormones. During labour, there is a spike in relaxin 3–4 hours before delivery, which is involved in myometrial relaxation and softening of the pelvic ligaments to aid preparation of the birth canal for the delivery of the horse foetus. Following birth, the levels of relaxin will gradually decrease if the placenta is also delivered, however, if the placenta is retained in the mare then the levels will remain high. In addition, if the mare undergoes an abortion then the relaxin levels will decline as the placenta ceases to function.

=== Cardiovascular function ===
Relaxin has been shown to relax vascular smooth muscle cells and increase nitric oxide production in rat endothelial cells, thus playing a role in regulation of cardiovascular function by dilating systemic resistance arteries. Relaxin increases the rate and force of cardiac contraction in rat models and has been found to promote maturation of cardiomyocytes in mice.

Several animal studies have found relaxin to have a cardioprotective function against ischaemia and reperfusion injury, by reducing cellular damage, via anti-apoptotic and anti-inflammatory effects. Relaxin has been shown to reduce cardiac fibrosis in animal models by inhibiting cardiac fibroblasts secreting collagen and stimulating matrix metalloproteinase.

In the European rabbit (Oryctolagus cuniculus), relaxin is associated with squamous differentiation and is expressed in tracheobronchial epithelial cells as opposed to being involved with reproduction.

== Receptors ==
Relaxin interacts with the relaxin receptor LGR7 (RXFP1) and LGR8 (RXFP2), which belong to the G protein-coupled receptor superfamily. They contain a heptahelical transmembrane domain and a large glycosylated ectodomain, distantly related to the receptors for the glycoproteohormones, such as the LH-receptor or FSH-receptor.

Relaxin receptors have been found in the heart, smooth muscle, the connective tissue, and central and autonomous nervous system.

== Disorders ==
Women who have been on relaxin treatment during unrelated clinical trials have experienced heavier bleeding during their menstrual cycle, suggesting that relaxin levels could play a role in abnormal uterine bleeding. However, more research is needed to confirm relaxin as a direct cause.

A lower expression of relaxin has been found amongst women who have endometriosis. The research in this area is limited and more studying of relaxin's contribution could contribute greatly to the understanding of endometriosis.

Specific disorders related to relaxin have not been heavily described, yet a link to scleroderma and fibromyalgia has also been suggested.

=== Pregnancy ===
It is possible that relaxin in the placenta could be a contributing factor to inducing labour in humans and therefore serum relaxin levels during pregnancy have been linked to premature birth.

== Pharmacological targets ==
Recombinant forms of human relaxin-2 such as volenrelaxin (LY3540378) and serelaxin (RLX030) have been developed as investigational drugs.

It is suggested that relaxin could be used as a therapeutic target when it comes to gynaecological disorders.

== Evolution ==
Relaxin 1 and relaxin 2 arose from the duplication of a proto-RLN gene between 44.2 and 29.6 million years ago in the last common ancestor of catarrhine primates. The duplication that led to RLN1 and RLN2 is thought to have been a result of positive selection and convergent evolution at the nucleotide level between the relaxin gene in New World monkeys and the RLN1 gene in apes. As a result, Old World monkeys, a group that includes the subfamilies colobines and cercopithecines, have lost the RLN1 paralog, but apes have retained both the RLN1 and the RLN2 genes.

== See also ==
- Relaxin family peptide hormones
- Insulin/IGF/Relaxin family
- Relaxin/insulin-like family peptide receptor 1
