= Relaxin/insulin-like family peptide receptor 4 =

Protein found in humans

RXFP4

Identifiers
- Aliases: RXFP4, GPCR142, GPR100, RLN3R2, RXFPR4, Relaxin/insulin-like family peptide receptor 4, relaxin/insulin like family peptide receptor 4, relaxin family peptide/INSL5 receptor 4
- External IDs: OMIM: 609043; MGI: 2182926; GeneCards: RXFP4

Gene location (Human)
Chr.	Chromosome 1 (human)
Band	1q22	Start	155,941,638 bp
Band	1q22	End	155,943,087 bp

Gene location (Mouse)
Chr.	Chromosome 3 (mouse)
Band	3|3 F1	Start	88,559,205 bp
Band	3|3 F1	End	88,560,449 bp
RNA expression pattern
Bgee	Human / Mouse (ortholog); Top expressed in: mucosa of transverse colon; sural nerve; rectum; granulocyte; duodenum; monocyte; bone marrow; blood; appendix; gastric mucosa / Top expressed in: embryo; More reference expression data
BioGPS	n/a
Gene ontology
Molecular function	protein binding; G protein-coupled receptor activity; signal transducer activity; galanin receptor activity; G protein-coupled peptide receptor activity
Cellular component	integral component of membrane; plasma membrane; integral component of plasma membrane; membrane
Biological process	phospholipase C-activating G protein-coupled receptor signaling pathway; positive regulation of feeding behavior; signal transduction; adenylate cyclase-modulating G protein-coupled receptor signaling pathway; neuropeptide signaling pathway; G protein-coupled receptor signaling pathway
Sources:Amigo / QuickGO
Orthologs
Databases	NCBI: entry; OMA: entry
Species	Human	Mouse
Entrez	339403	242093
Ensembl	ENSG00000173080	ENSMUSG00000049741
UniProt	Q8TDU9	Q7TQP4
RefSeq (mRNA)	NM_181885	NM_181817
RefSeq (protein)	NP_871001	NP_861538
Location (UCSC)	Chr 1: 155.94 – 155.94 Mb	Chr 3: 88.56 – 88.56 Mb
PubMed search
- Wikidata
View/Edit Human	View/Edit Mouse

Relaxin/insulin-like family peptide receptor 4 (RXFP4), also called RLN3 receptor 2, is a protein that in humans is encoded by the gene RXFP4. It is expressed especially in the intestines, where it acts as a high affinity receptor for the hormone INSL5, and can also be activated by RLN3, bradykinin, and kallidin.

RXFP4 is specifically a G-protein coupled receptor (rhodopsin-like family) which couples to a G_{io}-family G-proteins, and so activation reduces cellular cAMP levels.

== See also ==
- Relaxin receptor
