= Mitotoxin =

Type of toxin

A mitotoxin is a cytotoxic molecule targeted to specific cells by a mitogen. It is generally found in snake venom. Mitotoxins are responsible for mediating cell death by interfering with protein or DNA synthesis. Some mechanisms by which mitotoxins can interfere with DNA or protein synthesis include the inactivation of ribosomes or the inhibition of complexes in the mitochondrial electron transport chain. These toxins have a very high affinity and level of specificity for the receptors that they bind to. Mitotoxins bind to receptors on cell surfaces and are then internalized into cells via receptor-mediated endocytosis. Once in the endosome, the receptor releases its ligand and a mitotoxin can mediate cell death.

There are different classes of mitotoxins, each acting on a different type of cell or system. The mitotoxin classes that have been identified thus far include: interleukin-based, transferrin based, epidermal growth factor-based, nerve growth factor-based, insulin-like growth factor-I-based, and fibroblast growth factor-based mitotoxins. Because of the high affinity and specificity of mitotoxin binding, they present the possibility of creating precise therapeutic agents. A major one of these possibilities is the potential usage of growth factor-based mitotoxins as anti-neoplastic agents that can modulate the growth of melanomas.
