= Nucleus incertus =

Identifiers
- NeuroLex ID: nlx_144477

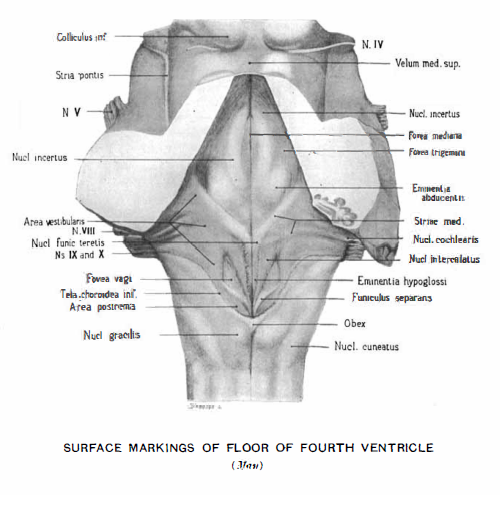
Surface anatomy of the floor of the Fourth ventricle, with the nucleus incertus labeled

The nucleus incertus is a brainstem region of the pontine brainstem, just ventral to the 4th ventricle. The term was coined by George Streeter (Latin for "uncertain nucleus") based on its unknown function at the time to name a group of cells he observed near the midline of the floor of the 4th ventricle. It sometimes called the 'nucleus O'.

The nucleus incertus is a bilateral structure which sits near the brainstem, in front of the nucleus prepositus hypoglossi. It consists of mostly ascending GABAergic projection neurons and glutamatergic neurons which innervate a broad range of forebrain regions involved in behavioural activation.

It is part of the theta network acting as a relay from the reticularis pontis oralis nucleus to the septo-hippocampal system. The stimulation of the nucleus incertus activates the hippocampal theta rhythm and either its lesion or inhibition suppress the theta oscillation induced by brainstem stimulation. The nucleus incertus itself presents theta oscillations coupled to the hippocampal theta rhythm.

In addition to hippocampal theta rhythms, the nucleus incertus is involved in the control of locomotor speed and arousal, response to stress and integrating the vestibulo-ocular reflex and gaze holding with hippocampal navigation.

== Neuroanatomy and Neurochemistry ==
The NI consists of GABAergic and glutamatergic neurons that project widely to other regions of the brain, including the septum, hippocampus, hypothalamus, amygdala, interpeduncular nucleus and prefrontal cortex. One of the defining neurochemical characteristics of NI GABAergic neurons is their expression of relaxin-3, a neuropeptide that acts via the G-protein-coupled receptor, known as RXFP3 in various brain regions, but can also activate RXFP1. The primary effect of RXFP3 receptor activation is the suppression of neuronal activity, which occurs mainly through the opening of M-channels, allowing an outward flow of potassium ions.

The relaxin-3/RXFP3 system has been extensively studied since its discovery in 2002 due to its involvement in stress and arousal-related functions. This peptidergic system is preserved throughout vertebrate evolution and is present in zebrafish and several other species, including human. Relaxin-3 (RLN3) is detected in at least two neuronal clusters in both teleosts and mammals, in the periaqueductal grey (PAG) and the NI. However, while in the teleosts the PAG/RLN3 projections target extensive areas of the forebrain and optic tectum, the NI/RLN3 projection is concentrated in the interpeduncular nucleus. By contrast, in mammals, PAG/RLN3 projections are restricted to the brainstem and diencephalon, while NI/RLN3 projections display a wide pattern of ascending projections to areas ranging from the nearby interpeduncular nucleus to the more distant hippocampus and prefrontal cortex. In both teleosts and mammals, the RLN3 signaling system plays a central role in arousal control.

In addition to relaxin-3, NI GABAergic neurons express other neuromodulators such as cholecystokinin (CCK) and neuromedin-B (NMB). These neurons also express receptors for corticotropin-releasing factor (CRF), orexins (hypocretins), melanin- concentrating hormone (MCH), serotonin (5-HT) and glutamate; and this diverse receptor expression profile suggests that the NI integrates signals from multiple neurotransmitter systems.

== Functional roles ==
The NI plays a role in various behavioral states, particularly arousal and stress responses. It is implicated in the modulation of theta rhythm, a type of brain oscillation that occurs during active behaviors and is critical for cognitive functions of learning, memory, and attention. NI neurons project strongly to the septohippocampal system, which is crucial for the generation and maintenance of theta rhythms, suggesting a modulatory role in cognitive processes.

=== Involvement in Stress Control ===
NI neurons are highly sensitive to stress-related stimuli and a high density of CRF receptor-1 (CRF-R1) in the NI likely mediate these responses. CRF-R1 are expressed by virtually all relaxin-3 positive neurons in the rat NI, and these relaxin-3 neurons are activated by both CRF and different stressors . Stress evoked activation of CRF-R1 in the NI activity impairs plasticity in the hippocampo-medial prefrontal cortical pathway. Studies have shown that activation of NI neurons can influence anxiety-like behaviors, linking the NI to stress and emotional regulation.

=== Stress and Alcohol Abuse ===
RLN3 and RXFP3 play a critical role in regulating stress-induced alcohol preference and the reinstatement of alcohol-seeking behavior in rodents. Central antagonism of RXFP3 effectively prevents stress-induced relapse, highlighting its potential as a target for interventions in alcohol addiction. Within this process, CRF-R1 in the NI has a central role, as intra-NI injections of CRF-R1 antagonists significantly attenuated stress-induced reinstatement of alcohol-seeking behavior. These findings indicate the crucial role of the RLN3/RXFP3 systems and CRF-R1 signaling within the NI in mediating addiction-related behaviors, especially under stress.

=== Involvement in Sleep-Wake Regulation ===
Emerging research has highlighted the role of the NI in sleep-wake cycles. The NI is active during wakefulness and has been proposed to promote arousal through its projections to the hypothalamus and forebrain. Experimental activation of the NI increases waking states, while its inhibition promotes sleep. Mice in which the relaxin-3 gene has been deleted display a hypoactive phenotype on free-access voluntary running wheels and mice with the RXFP3 gene deleted display an identical phenotype, suggesting this effect is mediated via the relaxin-3/RXFP3 and GABAergic signaling systems.

=== Cognitive and Behavioral Effects ===
The NI also plays a role in cognition, motivation, and reward-related behaviors via its widespread projections. Some studies have suggested a role for the NI in motivational states and appetitive behaviors, possibly through interactions with dopaminergic systems in reward-related brain regions such as the ventral tegmental area (VTA). Consistently, central administration of a relaxin-3 agonist peptide results in an immediate increase of food intake in satiated rats.

Moreover, relaxin-3/RXFP3 signaling in the hippocampus has been shown to influence learning and memory. Mice with RXFP3 deleted in the hippocampus demonstrate impairments in spatial memory, further supporting the idea that the NI modulates cognitive functions through its peptidergic pathways.
