= Surgery for the dysfunctional sacroiliac joint =

- Specialty: Orthopedic

The sacroiliac joint is a paired joint in the pelvis that lies between the sacrum and an ilium. Due to its location in the lower back, a dysfunctional sacroiliac joint may cause lower back and/or leg pain. The resulting leg pain can be severe, resembling sciatica or a slipped disc. While nonsurgical treatments are effective for some, others have found that surgery for the dysfunctional sacroiliac joint is the only method to relieve pain.

Sacroiliac joint dysfunction is diagnosed by a physician. Associated surgery should only occur when certain criteria are satisfied. Surgical options, such as the degree of invasiveness, can then be evaluated when deciding on a treatment plan.

If complications occur, they are often detected early (during surgery or shortly after) and correlate with the surgical approach. Results and outcomes vary according to the patient, pathology, surgeon, procedure, and methods.

== History ==
Sacroiliac joint surgery was first described in 1926 by the Journal of Bone and Joint Surgery. Following its appearance, the original procedure was documented in several publications and practices for nearly a century.

Sacroiliac joint surgeries have improved significantly beyond their nascency, which lacked the advent of hardware or instrumentation. The first use of sacroiliac joint surgical materials appeared in 1987 with the use of ceramic blocks to aid in joint fusing. The year 2001 marked the advent of spinal rods and screws to facilitate internal fixation. Continued improvements have been documented as surgeons reduce their incision size while avoiding tissues such as muscle, blood vessels, and nerves. Modern sacroiliac joint surgery utilizes instrumentation systems attempts to be as minimally invasive as possible.

The first surgical textbook on sacroiliac joint surgery was published in 2014.

== Diagnosis ==
The diagnosis of dysfunctional sacroiliac joint results from a combination of patient history, clinical evaluation, and one or more injections. The gold standard diagnostic injection utilizes a long-acting anesthetic agent with radiographic dye. A diagnosis can be made following injections into the posterior sacroiliac transverse ligament.

== Conservative treatment ==
Currently, there is no standard treatment regimen that must precede sacroiliac joint surgery. However, an algorithm has been designed (2010) to guide the treatment process before committing a patient to surgery. This algorithm allows for the use of alternative treatments (prolotherapy, radio frequency neural ablation, cryotherapy, acupuncture, and others) if desired by a clinician or patient.

== Surgical options ==
=== Fusion ===
When preparing to fuse the sacroiliac joint, a surgeon must consider the desired degree of invasiveness, surgical approach (fascial splitting that is posterior midline, posterior lateral, posterior lateral inferior, lateral, anterior), instrumentation, type of bone grafting material (autograft, allograft, and xenograft), and type of bone graft enhancing material (bone morphogenetic proteins). Another consideration is a patient's desired postoperative weight bearing status, as some procedures result in full weight bearing while others only partial.

Current diagnostic criteria (not standard but generally accepted) include at least 6 months of chronic pain, failure of previous treatments, disability from daily activities, and a diagnostic injection. There is no current standard operating procedure, though some surgeons may prefer an approach based on their training and exposure (there are exceptions).

The most frequently practiced fusion procedure is the lateral minimally invasive approach. One leading explanation for this involves the FDA having made possible a Premarket notification (510(k)) for instrumentation that has a predicate preceding 1976. Several lateral minimally invasive instrumentation systems have acquired this designation. Some procedures are unique in that they do not rely on a fusion of the joint.

==== Neuromodulation ====
Recent research by Guentchev et al. 2017 shows that peripheral nerve stimulation is a successful long-term therapy for degenerative sacroiliitis in older patients.

== Complications of fusion ==
Operating on a dysfunctional sacroiliac joint is an elective procedure and should never be an emergency. Preoperative planning and preparation should prevent or lessen the likelihood of most complications. However, aside from the general complications that encompass any reconstructive surgery, specific complications are associated with the sacroiliac joint.

The sacroiliac joint is essentially halfway between the ventral and dorsal sides of the body deep within the pelvis, a location in close proximity to several vital structures. Those structures within a few centimeters of the sacroiliac joint include the sacrum, ilium, sciatic nerve, dorsal and ventral sacral nerves, lumbar plexus, superior gluteal artery, iliac vessels, and large intestine. While these structures could be injured during any type of sacroiliac joint procedure, the lateral minimally invasive approach is associated with the greatest number of complications.

== Outcomes ==
Surgical outcome following dysfunctional sacroiliac joint correction has yet to be evaluated by multi-center studies. Multiple peer-reviewed articles have conducted followups, describing an overall success or satisfaction rate in the 70-80% range. However, one article was suggestive of poor outcomes with only 18% of patients being satisfied.

Surgery has been demonstrated to also be effective for some pathologies that involve sacroiliac joint dysfunction. The one exception is inflammatory arthritis, for which surgery achieves mixed results.

== Future ==
Surgeries for the dysfunctional sacroiliac joint are currently in their infancy, despite their many advances. Prospective and multi-center studies are needed to move this surgery into the knowledge base of surgical education and surgical societies. Advancements in surgery are expected to continue as science is applied further to the diagnosis and treatment of sacroiliac joint dysfunction.

== See also ==
- Myofascial pain
- Piriformis syndrome
- Trochanteric bursitis
