= Iliac tuberosity =

Prominence on the hip bone

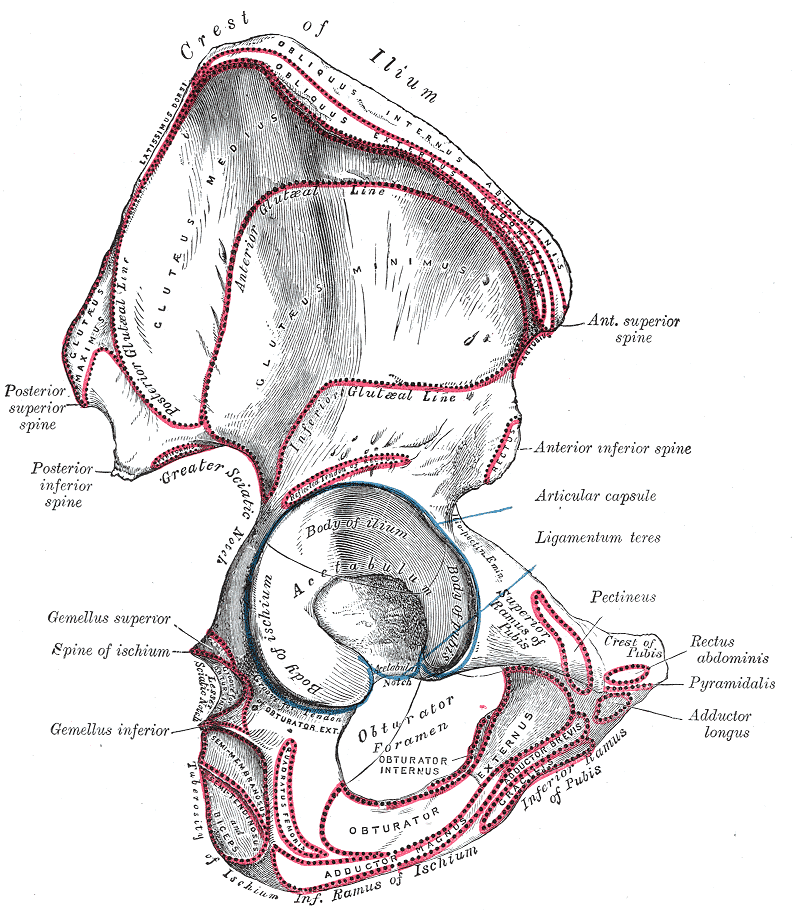
- Right hip bone. External surface.

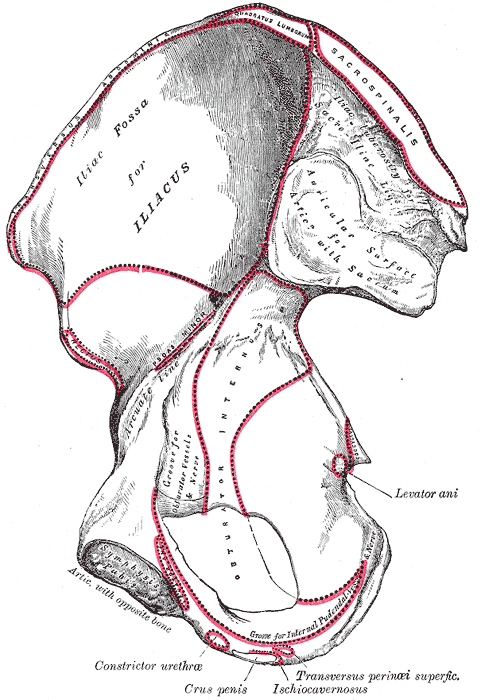
- Right hip bone. Internal surface.

Details

Identifiers
- Latin: tuberositas iliaca
- TA98: A02.5.01.122
- TA2: 1338
- FMA: 16908

The iliac tuberosity is part of the anatomy of the ilium portion of the hip bone. Behind the iliac fossa is a rough surface, divided into two portions, an anterior and a posterior. The posterior portion, the iliac tuberosity, is elevated and rough, for the attachment of the posterior sacroiliac ligaments and for the origins of the sacrospinalis and multifidus.
