= Insulin-like growth factor =

Proteins similar to insulin that stimulate cell proliferation

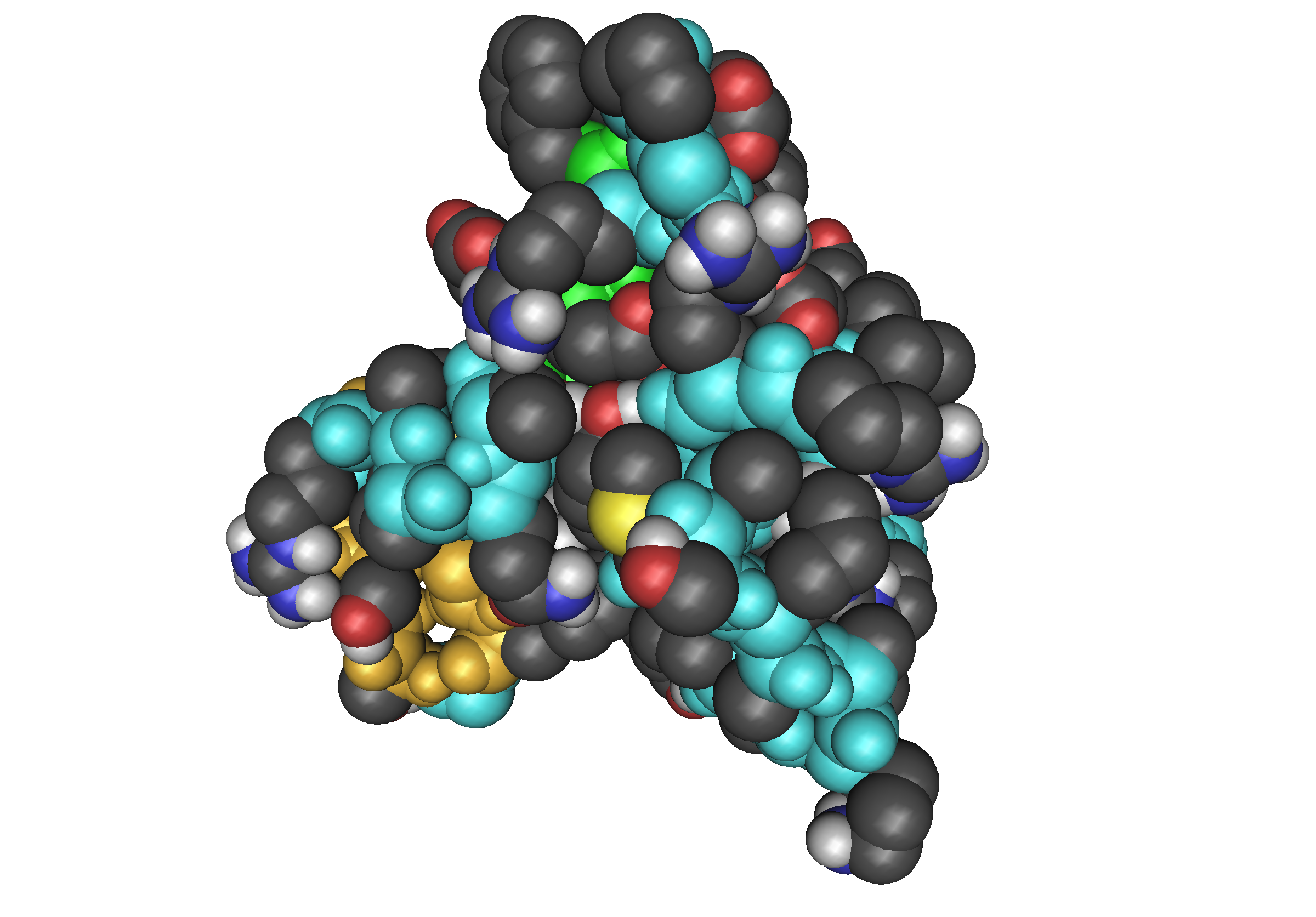
3GF1 insulin-like growth factor macromolecular structure

The insulin-like growth factors (IGFs) are proteins with high sequence similarity to insulin. IGFs are part of a complex system that cells use to communicate with their physiologic environment. This complex system (often referred to as the IGF "axis") consists of two cell-surface receptors (IGF1R and IGF2R), two ligands (IGF-1 and IGF-2), a family of seven high-affinity IGF-binding proteins (IGFBP1 to IGFBP7), as well as associated IGFBP degrading enzymes, referred to collectively as proteases.

== IGF-1/GH axis ==
The IGF "axis" is also commonly referred to as the Growth Hormone/IGF-1 Axis. Insulin-like growth factor 1 (commonly referred to as IGF-1 or at times using Roman numerals as IGF-I) is mainly secreted by the liver as a result of stimulation by growth hormone (GH). IGF-1 is important for both the regulation of normal physiology, as well as a number of pathological states, including cancer. The IGF axis has been shown to play roles in the promotion of cell proliferation and the inhibition of cell death (apoptosis).

Insulin-like growth factor 2 (IGF-2, at times IGF-II) is thought to be a primary growth factor required for early development while IGF-1 expression is required for achieving maximal growth. Gene knockout studies in mice have confirmed this, though other animals are likely to regulate the expression of these genes in distinct ways. While IGF-2 may be primarily fetal in action it is also essential for development and function of organs such as the brain, liver, and kidney.

Factors that are thought to cause variation in the levels of GH and IGF-1 in the circulation include an individual's genetic make-up, the time of day, age, sex, exercise status, stress levels, nutrition level, body mass index (BMI), disease state, race, estrogen status, and xenobiotic intake.

IGF-1 has an involvement in regulating neural development including neurogenesis, myelination, synaptogenesis, and dendritic branching and neuroprotection after neuronal damage. Increased serum levels of IGF-I in children have been associated with higher IQ.

IGF-1 shapes the development of the cochlea through controlling apoptosis. Its deficit can cause hearing loss. Serum level of it also underlies a correlation between short height and reduced hearing abilities particularly around 3–5 years of age, and at age 18 (late puberty).

== IGF receptors ==
The IGFs are known to bind the IGF-1 receptor, the insulin receptor, the IGF-2 receptor, the insulin-related receptor and possibly other receptors. The IGF-1 receptor is the "physiological" receptor. IGF-1 binds to it at significantly higher affinity than it binds the insulin receptor. Like the insulin receptor, the IGF-1 receptor is a receptor tyrosine kinase—meaning the receptor signals by causing the addition of a phosphate molecule on particular tyrosines. The IGF-2 receptor only binds IGF-2 and acts as a "clearance receptor"—it activates no intracellular signaling pathways, functioning only as an IGF-2 sequestering agent and preventing IGF-2 signaling.

== Organs and tissues affected by IGF-1 ==
Since many distinct tissue types express the IGF-1 receptor, IGF-1's effects are diverse. It acts as a neurotrophic factor, inducing the survival of neurons. It may catalyse skeletal muscle hypertrophy, by inducing protein synthesis, and by blocking muscle atrophy. It is protective for cartilage cells, and is associated with activation of osteocytes, and thus may be an anabolic factor for bone. Since at high concentrations it is capable of activating the insulin receptor, it can also complement for the effects of insulin. Receptors for IGF-1 are found in vascular smooth muscle, while typical receptors for insulin are not found in vascular smooth muscle.

== IGF-binding proteins ==
IGF-1 and IGF-2 are regulated by a family of proteins known as the IGF-binding proteins. These proteins help to modulate IGF action in complex ways that involve both inhibiting IGF action by preventing binding to the IGF-1 receptor as well as promoting IGF action possibly through aiding in delivery to the receptor and increasing IGF half-life. Currently, there are seven characterized IGF Binding Proteins (IGFBP1 to IGFBP7). There is currently significant data suggesting that IGFBPs play important roles in addition to their ability to regulate IGFs. IGF-1 and IGFBP-3 are GH dependent, whereas IGFBP-1 is insulin regulated. IGFBP-1 production from the liver is significantly elevated during insulinopenia while serum levels of bioactive IGF-1 is increased by insulin.

== Diseases affected by IGF ==
Studies of recent interest show that the Insulin/IGF axis play an important role in aging. Nematodes, fruit-flies, and other organisms have an increased life span when the gene equivalent to the mammalian insulin is knocked out. It is somewhat difficult to relate this finding to mammals, however, because there are many genes (at least 37 in the nematode Caenorhabditis elegans) in smaller organisms that are "insulin-like" or "IGF-1-like", whereas in mammals insulin-like proteins comprise only seven members (insulin, IGFs, relaxins, EPIL, and relaxin-like factor). The human insulin-like genes have apparently distinct roles with some but less crosstalk presumably because there are multiple insulin-receptor-like proteins in humans. Simpler organisms typically have fewer receptors; for example, only one insulin-like receptor exists in the nematode C. elegans. Additionally, C. elegans do not have specialized organs such as the (Islets of Langerhans), which sense insulin in response to glucose homeostasis. Moreover, IGF1 affects lifespan in nematodes by causing dauer formation, a developmental stage of C. elegans larva. There is no mammalian correlate. Therefore, it is an open question as to whether either IGF-1 or insulin in the mammal may perturb aging, although there is the suggestion that dietary restriction phenomena may be related.

Other studies are beginning to uncover the important role the IGFs play in diseases such as cancer and diabetes, showing for instance that IGF-1 stimulates growth of both prostate and breast cancer cells. Researchers are not in complete agreement about the degree of cancer risk that IGF-1 poses.

== See also ==
- Growth hormone treatment
- HGH controversies
- Insulin/IGF/Relaxin family
