= Volenrelaxin =

Clinical data
- Other names: LY3540378

Legal status
- Legal status: Investigational

Identifiers
- CAS Number: 2653949-19-8
- UNII: TVT9XLV5MU
- KEGG: D12783

Volenrelaxin (LY3540378) is a long-acting, synthetic analogue of relaxin developed by Eli Lilly and Company to treat heart failure.
