= Interosseous sacroiliac ligament =

Ligament of the pelvis

Details

Identifiers
- Latin: ligamentum sacroiliacum interosseum
- TA98: A03.6.03.003
- TA2: 1863
- FMA: 21467

The interosseous sacroiliac ligament, also known as the axial interosseous ligament, is a ligament of the sacroiliac joint that lies deep to the posterior ligament. It connects the tuberosities of the sacrum and the ilium of the pelvis.

== Structure ==
The interosseous sacroiliac ligament consists of a series of short, strong fibers connecting the tuberosities of the sacrum and ilium. It is one of the strongest ligaments in the body.

== Function ==
The major function of the interosseous sacroiliac ligament is to keep the sacrum and ilium together. This prevents abduction or distraction of the sacroiliac joint. It also helps to bear the weight of the thorax, upper limbs, head, and neck. This is performed by the nearly horizontal direction of the fibers running perpendicular from the sacrum to the ilium.
