= Relaxin/insulin-like family peptide receptor 3 =

Protein-coding gene in the species Homo sapiens

RXFP3

Identifiers
- Aliases: RXFP3, GPCR135, RLN3R1, RXFPR3, SALPR, Relaxin/insulin-like family peptide receptor 3, relaxin/insulin like family peptide receptor 3, relaxin family peptide receptor 3
- External IDs: OMIM: 609445; MGI: 2441827; GeneCards: RXFP3

Gene location (Human)
Chr.	Chromosome 5 (human)
Band	5p13.2	Start	33,936,386 bp
Band	5p13.2	End	33,938,918 bp

Gene location (Mouse)
Chr.	Chromosome 15 (mouse)
Band	15|15 A1	Start	11,033,803 bp
Band	15|15 A1	End	11,038,077 bp
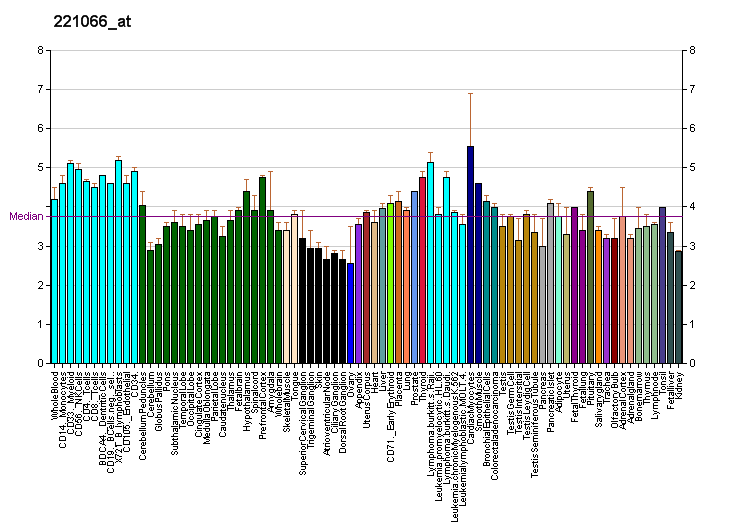
RNA expression pattern
Bgee	Human / Mouse (ortholog); Top expressed in: islet of Langerhans; right adrenal cortex; left adrenal cortex; prefrontal cortex; superior frontal gyrus; anterior pituitary; hypothalamus; caudate nucleus; substantia nigra; head / Top expressed in: embryo; dentate gyrus of hippocampal formation granule cell; embryo; hippocampus proper; hypothalamus; visual cortex; neural tube; mesencephalon; neural layer of retina; primary visual cortex; More reference expression data
BioGPS	More reference expression data
Gene ontology
Molecular function	G protein-coupled receptor activity; signal transducer activity; galanin receptor activity; G protein-coupled peptide receptor activity
Cellular component	integral component of membrane; plasma membrane; integral component of plasma membrane; membrane
Biological process	positive regulation of cytokinesis; G protein-coupled receptor signaling pathway; phospholipase C-activating G protein-coupled receptor signaling pathway; positive regulation of cytosolic calcium ion concentration involved in phospholipase C-activating G protein-coupled signaling pathway; signal transduction; adenylate cyclase-modulating G protein-coupled receptor signaling pathway; neuropeptide signaling pathway
Sources:Amigo / QuickGO
Orthologs
Databases	NCBI: entry; OMA: entry
Species	Human	Mouse
Entrez	51289	239336
Ensembl	ENSG00000182631; ENSG00000277069	ENSMUSG00000060735
UniProt	Q9NSD7	Q8BGE9
RefSeq (mRNA)	NM_016568	NM_178717
RefSeq (protein)	NP_057652	NP_848832
Location (UCSC)	Chr 5: 33.94 – 33.94 Mb	Chr 15: 11.03 – 11.04 Mb
PubMed search
- Wikidata
View/Edit Human	View/Edit Mouse

Relaxin/insulin-like family peptide receptor 3, also known as RXFP3, is a human G-protein coupled receptor.

== See also ==
- Relaxin receptor
