= Relaxin-1 =

Hormone found in humans

RLN1

Identifiers
- Aliases: RLN1, H1, H1RLX, RLXH1, bA12D24.3.1, bA12D24.3.2, relaxin 1
- External IDs: OMIM: 179730; MGI: 97931; GeneCards: RLN1

Gene location (Human)
Chr.	Chromosome 9 (human)
Band	9p24.1	Start	5,334,930 bp
Band	9p24.1	End	5,339,876 bp

Gene location (Mouse)
Chr.	Chromosome 19 (mouse)
Band	19 C1|19 23.83 cM	Start	29,308,570 bp
Band	19 C1|19 23.83 cM	End	29,312,070 bp
RNA expression pattern
Bgee	Human / Mouse (ortholog); Top expressed in: oocyte; gonad; testicle; secondary oocyte; prostate; islet of Langerhans; granulocyte; buccal mucosa cell; anterior pituitary; lymph node / Top expressed in: embryo; embryo; entorhinal cortex; choroid plexus of fourth ventricle; dentate gyrus of hippocampal formation granule cell; CA3 field; perirhinal cortex; suprachiasmatic nucleus; neural tube; superior frontal gyrus; More reference expression data
BioGPS	n/a
Gene ontology
Molecular function	hormone activity
Cellular component	extracellular region
Biological process	signal transduction; female pregnancy; regulation of signaling receptor activity
Sources:Amigo / QuickGO
Orthologs
Databases	NCBI: entry; OMA: entry
Species	Human	Mouse
Entrez	6013	19773
Ensembl	ENSG00000107018	ENSMUSG00000039097
UniProt	P04808	P47932
RefSeq (mRNA)	NM_006911	NM_011272
RefSeq (protein)	NP_008842	NP_035402
Location (UCSC)	Chr 9: 5.33 – 5.34 Mb	Chr 19: 29.31 – 29.31 Mb
PubMed search
- Wikidata
View/Edit Human	View/Edit Mouse

Relaxin-1 is a primate-specific peptide hormone that in humans is encoded by the gene RLN1. Relaxin-1 is a relaxin-like peptide which is particularly closely related to the pregnancy relaxin hormone (RLN2), but is expressed in the prostate and not the ovaries, placenta, or decidua.

== Evolution ==
The RLN1 and RLN2 genes split off from a single precursor gene due to a relatively recent duplication event. Because of this, most mammals only have a single gene that is related to both, but is functionally most similar to RLN2, and confusingly often called Rln1.
