= Anterior sacroiliac ligament =

Pelvic ligaments connecting the sacrum and hip bone

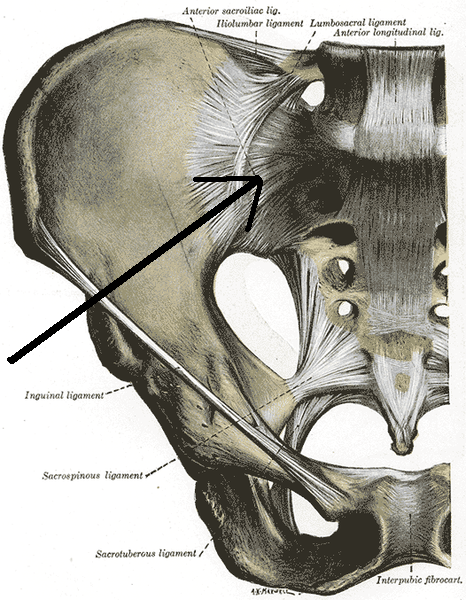
- Joints of the pelvis seen from the front (anterior sacroiliac ligament labeled at upper right)

Details
- From: Anterior surface of the lateral part of the sacrum
- To: Auricular surface of the ilium and preauricular sulcus

Identifiers
- Latin: ligamentum sacroiliacum anterius
- TA98: A03.6.03.002
- TA2: 1862
- FMA: 21464

The Anterior Sacroiliac Ligament (ASL) forms from a thickened part of the anterior joint capsule, and consists of numerous thin bands which form a smooth sheet of dense connective tissue spanning from the anterior surface of the lateral part of the sacrum to the margin of the auricular surface of the ilium and to the preauricular sulcus. It is also called the Ventral Sacroiliac Ligament. The Anterior Sacroiliac Ligament stretches between the ventral surfaces of the sacral alar and ilium. The ASL is the thinnest sacroiliac joint ligament and it is generally larger in males.

== See also ==
- Posterior sacroiliac ligament
