= Relaxin/insulin-like family peptide receptor 1 =

Protein-coding gene in the species Homo sapiens

RXFP1
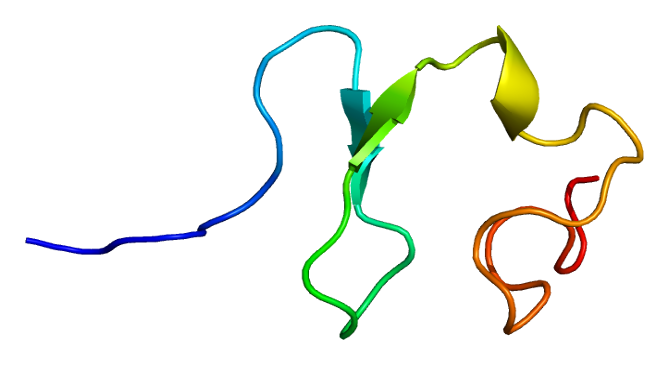

Identifiers
- Aliases: RXFP1, LGR7, RXFPR1, Relaxin/insulin-like family peptide receptor 1, relaxin/insulin like family peptide receptor 1, relaxin family peptide receptor 1
- External IDs: OMIM: 606654; MGI: 2682211; GeneCards: RXFP1
Available structures
PDB	Ortholog search: PDBe RCSB
PDB	List of PDB id codes 2JM4, 2M7P

Gene location (Human)
Chr.	Chromosome 4 (human)
Band	4q32.1	Start	158,315,311 bp
Band	4q32.1	End	158,653,372 bp

Gene location (Mouse)
Chr.	Chromosome 3 (mouse)
Band	3|3 E3	Start	79,548,918 bp
Band	3|3 E3	End	79,645,187 bp
RNA expression pattern
Bgee	Human / Mouse (ortholog); Top expressed in: decidua; endothelial cell; endometrium; Brodmann area 46; testicle; prefrontal cortex; Brodmann area 9; superior frontal gyrus; Brodmann area 23; cingulate gyrus / Top expressed in: uterus; genital tubercle; primary visual cortex; superior frontal gyrus; cervix; dentate gyrus of hippocampal formation granule cell; atrioventricular valve; muscle of thigh; hippocampus proper; cerebellar cortex; More reference expression data
BioGPS	n/a
Gene ontology
Molecular function	G protein-coupled receptor activity; protein binding; signal transducer activity; metal ion binding; G protein-coupled peptide receptor activity
Cellular component	integral component of membrane; membrane; plasma membrane; intracellular anatomical structure; integral component of plasma membrane
Biological process	signal transduction; adenylate cyclase-modulating G protein-coupled receptor signaling pathway; G protein-coupled receptor signaling pathway; adenylate cyclase-activating G protein-coupled receptor signaling pathway; activation of adenylate cyclase activity; hormone-mediated signaling pathway
Sources:Amigo / QuickGO
Orthologs
Databases	NCBI: entry; OMA: entry
Species	Human	Mouse
Entrez	59350	381489
Ensembl	ENSG00000171509	ENSMUSG00000034009
UniProt	Q9HBX9	Q6R6I7
RefSeq (mRNA)	NM_001253727; NM_001253728; NM_001253729; NM_001253730; NM_001253732 NM_001253733; NM_021634; NM_001363776	NM_212452
RefSeq (protein)	NP_001240656; NP_001240657; NP_001240658; NP_001240659; NP_001240661 NP_001240662; NP_067647; NP_001350705	NP_997617
Location (UCSC)	Chr 4: 158.32 – 158.65 Mb	Chr 3: 79.55 – 79.65 Mb
PubMed search
- Wikidata
View/Edit Human	View/Edit Mouse

Relaxin/insulin-like family peptide receptor 1, also known as RXFP1, is a human G protein coupled receptor that is one of the relaxin receptors. It is a rhodopsin-like GPCR which is unusual in this class as it contains a large extracellular binding and signalling domain. Some reports suggest that RXFP1 forms homodimers, however the most recent evidence indicates that relaxin binds a non-homodimer of RXFP1.

== See also ==
- Relaxin family peptide hormones
- Insulin/IGF/Relaxin family
- Relaxin
  - Relaxin-3
