= Insulin like 6 =

Protein

INSL6

Identifiers
- Aliases: INSL6, RIF1, insulin like 6
- External IDs: OMIM: 606414; MGI: 1351595; GeneCards: INSL6

Gene location (Human)
Chr.	Chromosome 9 (human)
Band	9p24.1	Start	5,123,880 bp
Band	9p24.1	End	5,185,647 bp

Gene location (Mouse)
Chr.	Chromosome 19 (mouse)
Band	19|19 C1	Start	29,298,744 bp
Band	19|19 C1	End	29,302,756 bp
RNA expression pattern
Bgee	Human / Mouse (ortholog); Top expressed in: testicle; left testis; right testis; Achilles tendon; gonad; monocyte; popliteal artery; tibial arteries; ascending aorta; Descending thoracic aorta / Top expressed in: seminiferous tubule; spermatocyte; spermatid; jejunum; transitional epithelium of urinary bladder; duodenum; intestinal villus; ileum; right kidney; embryo; More reference expression data
BioGPS	n/a
Gene ontology
Molecular function	hormone activity
Cellular component	extracellular region; cellular component
Biological process	regulation of signaling receptor activity; biological process; signal transduction
Sources:Amigo / QuickGO
Orthologs
Databases	NCBI: entry; OMA: entry
Species	Human	Mouse
Entrez	11172	27356
Ensembl	ENSG00000120210	ENSMUSG00000050957
UniProt	Q9Y581	Q9QY05
RefSeq (mRNA)	NM_007179	NM_013754
RefSeq (protein)	NP_009110	NP_038782
Location (UCSC)	Chr 9: 5.12 – 5.19 Mb	Chr 19: 29.3 – 29.3 Mb
PubMed search
- Wikidata
View/Edit Human	View/Edit Mouse

Insulin like 6 is a protein that in humans is encoded by the INSL6 gene.

== Function ==
The protein encoded by this gene contains a classical signature of the insulin superfamily and is significantly similar to relaxin and relaxin-like factor. This gene is preferentially expressed in testis. Its expression in testis is restricted to interstitial cells surrounding seminiferous tubules, which suggests a role in sperm development and fertilization.
