= INSL5 =

Hormone found in humans

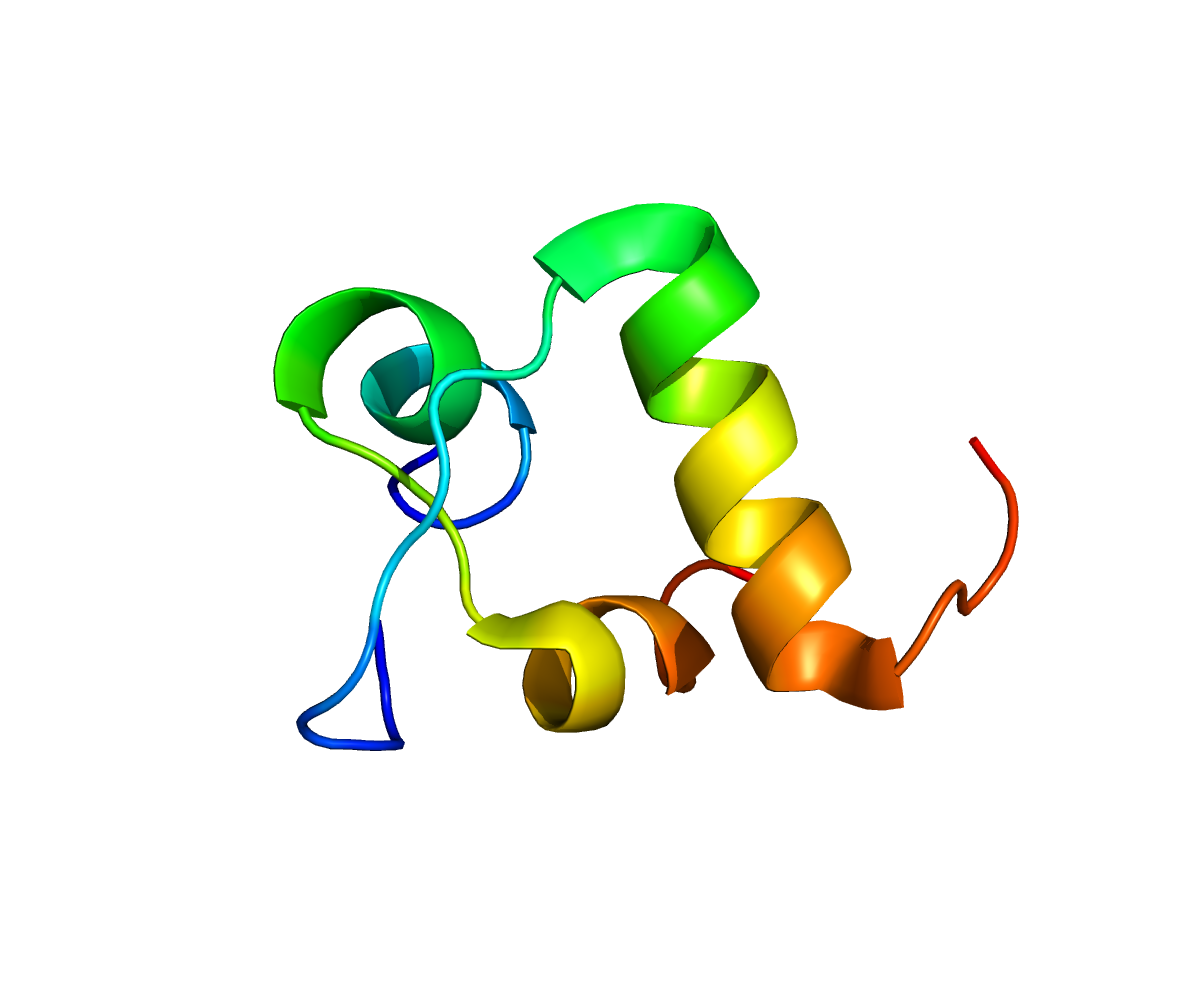

Identifiers
- Aliases: INSL5, PRO182, UNQ156, insulin like 5
- External IDs: OMIM: 606413; MGI: 1346085; GeneCards: INSL5
Available structures
PDB	Ortholog search: PDBe RCSB
PDB	List of PDB id codes 2K1V, 2KBC

Gene location (Human)
Chr.	Chromosome 1 (human)
Band	1p31.3	Start	66,797,740 bp
Band	1p31.3	End	66,801,276 bp

Gene location (Mouse)
Chr.	Chromosome 4 (mouse)
Band	4 C6|4 47.27 cM	Start	102,875,069 bp
Band	4 C6|4 47.27 cM	End	102,884,039 bp
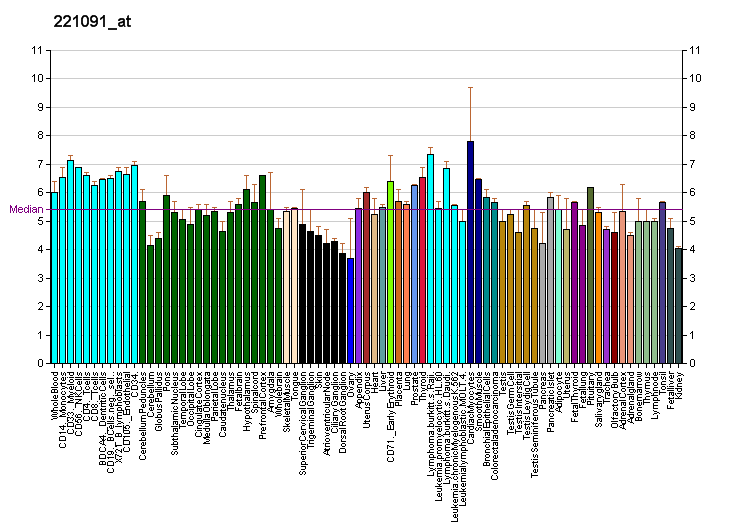
RNA expression pattern
Bgee	Human / Mouse (ortholog); Top expressed in: rectum; mucosa of sigmoid colon; testicle; mucosa of transverse colon; right uterine tube; hypothalamus; Brodmann area 9; nucleus accumbens; hippocampus proper; muscle tissue / Top expressed in: left colon; neural layer of retina; epithelium of small intestine; thymus; embryo; embryo; spermatid; inner nuclear layer; enteric nervous system; outer nuclear layer; More reference expression data
BioGPS	More reference expression data
Gene ontology
Molecular function	hormone activity; G protein-coupled receptor binding
Cellular component	extracellular region; cellular component
Biological process	positive regulation of feeding behavior; regulation of signaling receptor activity; G protein-coupled receptor signaling pathway; biological process
Sources:Amigo / QuickGO
Orthologs
Databases	NCBI: entry; OMA: entry
Species	Human	Mouse
Entrez	10022	23919
Ensembl	ENSG00000172410	ENSMUSG00000066090
UniProt	Q9Y5Q6	Q9WUG6
RefSeq (mRNA)	NM_005478	NM_001290648; NM_011831
RefSeq (protein)	NP_005469	NP_001277577; NP_035961
Location (UCSC)	Chr 1: 66.8 – 66.8 Mb	Chr 4: 102.88 – 102.88 Mb
PubMed search
- Wikidata
View/Edit Human	View/Edit Mouse

Insulin-like peptide 5 (INSL5) is a hormone that in humans is encoded by the INSL5 gene. This hormone is secreted by the large intestines and activates the RXFP4 receptor with high affinity. It may be involved in regulating intestinal contractions or the development of the thymus.

== Function ==
The protein encoded by this gene contains a classical signature of the insulin superfamily and is highly similar to relaxin-3 (RLN3/INSL7).
