= Relaxin/insulin-like family peptide receptor 2 =

Protein-coding gene in the species Homo sapiens

RXFP2

Identifiers
- Aliases: RXFP2, GPR106, GREAT, INSL3R, LGR8, LGR8.1, RXFPR2, Relaxin/insulin-like family peptide receptor 2, relaxin/insulin like family peptide receptor 2, relaxin family peptide receptor 2
- External IDs: OMIM: 606655; MGI: 2153463; GeneCards: RXFP2
Available structures
| PDB | Ortholog search: PDBe RCSB |
| PDB | List of PDB id codes 2M96 |

Gene location (Human)
| Chr. | Chromosome 13 (human) |
| Band | 13q13.1 | Start | 31,739,526 bp |
| Band | 13q13.1 | End | 31,803,389 bp |

Gene location (Mouse)
| Chr. | Chromosome 5 (mouse) |
| Band | 5 G3|5 89.23 cM | Start | 149,942,140 bp |
| Band | 5 G3|5 89.23 cM | End | 150,005,649 bp |
RNA expression pattern
| Bgee | Human / Mouse (ortholog); Top expressed in: testicle; monocyte; granulocyte; gonad; left uterine tube; blood; smooth muscle tissue; right adrenal cortex; left adrenal gland; left adrenal cortex / Top expressed in: mesothelium; spermatocyte; mesothelium of peritoneum; spermatid; seminiferous tubule; embryo; embryo; vas deferens; genital tubercle; abdominal wall; More reference expression data |
| BioGPS | n/a |
Gene ontology
| Molecular function | protein-hormone receptor activity; signal transducer activity; G protein-coupled receptor activity; peptide hormone binding; G protein-coupled peptide receptor activity |
| Cellular component | integral component of membrane; membrane; plasma membrane; intracellular anatomical structure; integral component of plasma membrane |
| Biological process | male gonad development; negative regulation of apoptotic process; adenylate cyclase-inhibiting G protein-coupled receptor signaling pathway; adenylate cyclase-activating G protein-coupled receptor signaling pathway; oocyte maturation; signal transduction; negative regulation of cell population proliferation; adenylate cyclase-modulating G protein-coupled receptor signaling pathway; G protein-coupled receptor signaling pathway; positive regulation of cAMP-mediated signaling; activation of adenylate cyclase activity; hormone-mediated signaling pathway |
Sources:Amigo / QuickGO
Orthologs
| Databases | NCBI: entry; OMA: entry |
| Species | Human | Mouse |
| Entrez | 122042 | 140498 |
| Ensembl | ENSG00000133105 | ENSMUSG00000053368 |
| UniProt | Q8WXD0 | Q91ZZ5 |
| RefSeq (mRNA) | NM_001166058; NM_130806 | NM_001289564; NM_001289566; NM_080468 |
| RefSeq (protein) | NP_001159530; NP_570718 | NP_001276493; NP_001276495; NP_536716 |
| Location (UCSC) | Chr 13: 31.74 – 31.8 Mb | Chr 5: 149.94 – 150.01 Mb |
| PubMed search |
- Wikidata
| View/Edit Human | View/Edit Mouse |

Relaxin/insulin-like family peptide receptor 2, also known as RXFP2, is a human G-protein coupled receptor.

The receptors for glycoprotein hormones such as follicle-stimulating hormone (FSH; see MIM 136530) and thyroid-stimulating hormone (TSH; see MIM 188540) are G protein-coupled, 7-transmembrane receptors (GPCRs) with large N-terminal extracellular domains. Leucine-rich repeat (LRR)-containing GPCRs (LGRs) form a subgroup of the GPCR superfamily. [supplied by OMIM].

== See also ==
- Relaxin receptor
