= Relaxin-3 =

RLN3

Identifiers
- Aliases: RLN3, H3, RXN3, ZINS4, insl7, relaxin 3
- External IDs: OMIM: 606855; MGI: 2158015; GeneCards: RLN3
Available structures
PDB	Ortholog search: PDBe RCSB
PDB	List of PDB id codes 2FHW, 2K1V

Gene location (Human)
Chr.	Chromosome 19 (human)
Band	19p13.12	Start	14,028,148 bp
Band	19p13.12	End	14,031,551 bp

Gene location (Mouse)
Chr.	Chromosome 8 (mouse)
Band	8|8 C2	Start	84,769,558 bp
Band	8|8 C2	End	84,771,629 bp
RNA expression pattern
Bgee	Human / Mouse (ortholog); Top expressed in: testicle; granulocyte; gonad; blood; right testis; left testis; right lung; monocyte; spleen; olfactory zone of nasal mucosa / Top expressed in: secondary oocyte; primary oocyte; zygote; morula; embryo; embryo; yolk sac; epiblast; blastocyst; thymus; More reference expression data
BioGPS	n/a
Gene ontology
Molecular function	protein binding; hormone activity; G protein-coupled receptor binding
Cellular component	extracellular region
Biological process	regulation of signaling receptor activity; G protein-coupled receptor signaling pathway
Sources:Amigo / QuickGO
Orthologs
Databases	NCBI: entry; OMA: entry
Species	Human	Mouse
Entrez	117579	212108
Ensembl	ENSG00000171136; ENSG00000288474	ENSMUSG00000045232
UniProt	Q8WXF3	Q8CHK2
RefSeq (mRNA)	NM_080864; NM_001311197	NM_173184
RefSeq (protein)	NP_001298126; NP_543140	NP_775276
Location (UCSC)	Chr 19: 14.03 – 14.03 Mb	Chr 8: 84.77 – 84.77 Mb
PubMed search
- Wikidata
View/Edit Human	View/Edit Mouse

Structure of relaxin-3

Relaxin-3 neurons in the mouse nucleus incertus

Distribution of relaxin-3 neurons and projections

Relaxin-3 is a protein that in humans is encoded by the RLN3 gene. This neuropeptide is highly conserved in species ranging from flies, fish, rodents and humans. Relaxin-3 is a member and ancestral gene of the relaxin family of peptides, which includes the namesake hormone relaxin (designated 'H2 relaxin' in humans) which mediates peripheral actions during pregnancy and which was found to relax the pelvic ligament in guinea pigs almost a century ago. The cognate receptor for relaxin-3 is the G-protein coupled receptor RXFP3 (relaxin family peptide 3 receptor), however relaxin-3 is pharmacologically able to also cross react with RXFP1 and RXFP3 (although the physiological relevance of such interactions, if they exist endogenously, are currently unknown).

== Structure ==
Relaxin-3 consists of 51 amino acids in humans which are arranged into a two-chain structure (designated the A-chain and B-chain). There are three disulfide bonds (two interchain, one intrachain), with the residues that mediate binding to/activation of RXFP3 residing within the B-chain. At translation, pro-relaxin-3 also contains a C-chain (in between the A and B-chains) which is removed via protolytic cleavage to form the mature neuropeptide.

== Distribution ==
Relaxin-3 is mostly expressed within neurons of the brain, where it is packaged into dense cored vesicles and trafficked along axons where it can be detected in presynaptic vesicles before release onto target neurons, characteristic of a neurotransmitter. The largest number of relaxin-3-positive neurons in the rodent brain are within a region of the pontine brainstem known as the nucleus incertus, while smaller populations are present within the pontine raphe, periaqueductal grey, and an area dorsal to the substantia nigra. From these centres, relaxin-3 innervates a broad range of brain regions which are also rich in RXFP3 mRNA/binding sites, including the extended limbic system and the septohippocampal pathway.

== Function ==
The broad distribution of relaxin-3 fibres/RXFP3 within several key neuronal circuits suggests an ability to modulate a broad range of behaviours. This has been confirmed in a growing number of rodent studies, which demonstrate relaxin-3 is able to modulate arousal, the response to stress, feeding/metabolism and memory; and likely plays a role in the generation/regulation of hippocampal theta rhythm.

== Relevance to human disease ==
Neuropeptides such as relaxin-3 are attracting increasing interest as targets for the pharmacological treatment of a range of neuropsychiatric diseases. Due to the ability of relaxin-3 to modulate neuronal processes/behaviours such as mood, stress responses and cognition, which are often aberrant in mental illnesses, considerable potential exists for the development of relaxin-3-based drugs to therapeutically treat depression and other mental illnesses.

== Discovery ==
This neuropeptide was discovered in 2001.

== See also ==
- Relaxin family peptide hormones
- Insulin/IGF/Relaxin family
- Relaxin
- Relaxin/insulin-like family peptide receptor 1
