= INSL4 =

Protein-coding gene in the species Homo sapiens

Identifiers
- Aliases: INSL4, EPIL, PLACENTIN, insulin like 4
- External IDs: OMIM: 600910; GeneCards: INSL4

Gene location (Human)
Chr.	Chromosome 9 (human)
Band	9p24.1	Start	5,231,419 bp
Band	9p24.1	End	5,235,304 bp
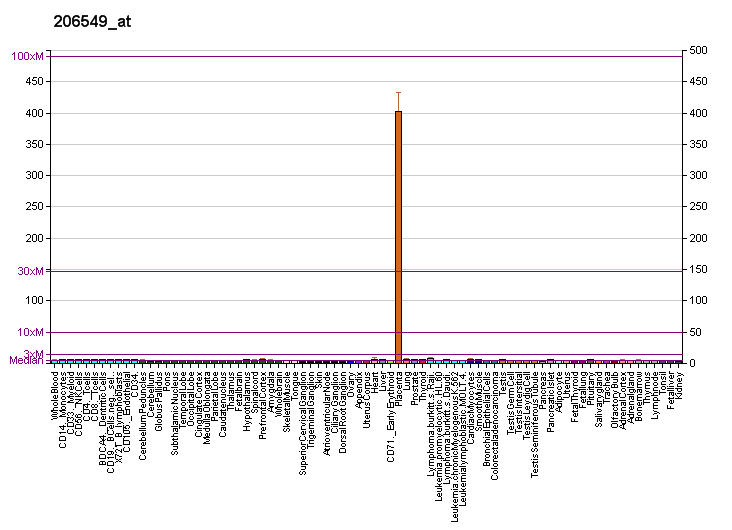
RNA expression pattern
Bgee	Human / Mouse (ortholog); Top expressed in: placenta; gonad; corpus epididymis; stromal cell of endometrium; cecum; appendix; liver; smooth muscle tissue; right lobe of liver; popliteal artery / n/a; More reference expression data
BioGPS	More reference expression data
Gene ontology
Molecular function	signaling receptor binding; insulin-like growth factor receptor binding; hormone activity
Cellular component	extracellular region; extracellular space
Biological process	multicellular organism development; female pregnancy; cell-cell signaling; cell population proliferation; signal transduction; regulation of signaling receptor activity; positive regulation of chorionic trophoblast cell proliferation
Sources:Amigo / QuickGO
Orthologs
Databases	NCBI: entry; OMA: entry
Species	Human	Mouse
Entrez	3641	n/a
Ensembl	ENSG00000120211	n/a
UniProt	Q14641	n/a
RefSeq (mRNA)	NM_002195	n/a
RefSeq (protein)	NP_002186	n/a
Location (UCSC)	Chr 9: 5.23 – 5.24 Mb	n/a
PubMed search		n/a
- Wikidata
View/Edit Human

Early placenta insulin-like peptide is a protein that in humans is encoded by the INSL4 gene.

INSL4 encodes the insulin-like 4 protein, a member of the insulin superfamily. INSL4 encodes a precursor that undergoes post-translational cleavage to produce 3 polypeptide chains, A-C, that form tertiary structures composed of either all three chains, or just the A and B chains. Expression of INSL4 products occurs within the early placental cytotrophoblast and syncytiotrophoblast.
