= INSL3 =

Protein-coding gene in the species Homo sapiens

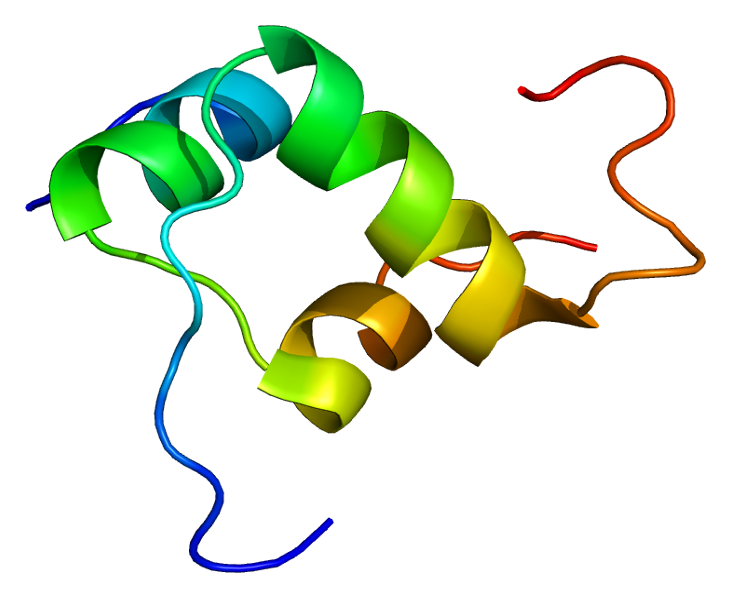

Identifiers
- Aliases: INSL3, RLF, RLNL, ley-I-L, insulin like 3
- External IDs: OMIM: 146738; MGI: 108427; GeneCards: INSL3
Available structures
PDB	Ortholog search: PDBe RCSB
PDB	List of PDB id codes 2H8B, 2K6T, 2K6U

Gene location (Human)
Chr.	Chromosome 19 (human)
Band	19p13.11	Start	17,816,512 bp
Band	19p13.11	End	17,821,574 bp

Gene location (Mouse)
Chr.	Chromosome 8 (mouse)
Band	8 B3.3|8 34.43 cM	Start	72,141,858 bp
Band	8 B3.3|8 34.43 cM	End	72,143,219 bp
RNA expression pattern
Bgee	Human / Mouse (ortholog); Top expressed in: right testis; left testis; testicle; gonad; granulocyte; buccal mucosa cell; blood; spleen; appendix; right ovary / Top expressed in: testicle; spermatocyte; spleen; islet of Langerhans; bone marrow; urinary bladder; adrenal gland; duodenum; thymus; embryo; More reference expression data
BioGPS	n/a
Gene ontology
Molecular function	protease binding; signaling receptor binding; insulin receptor binding; hormone activity; G protein-coupled receptor binding
Cellular component	extracellular region; extracellular space
Biological process	cell-cell signaling; positive regulation of wound healing; positive regulation of epithelial cell migration; spermatogenesis; regulation of signaling receptor activity; G protein-coupled receptor signaling pathway; adenylate cyclase-inhibiting G protein-coupled receptor signaling pathway
Sources:Amigo / QuickGO
Orthologs
Databases	NCBI: entry; OMA: entry
Species	Human	Mouse
Entrez	3640	16336
Ensembl	ENSG00000248099	ENSMUSG00000079019
UniProt	P51460	O09107; Q5RL10
RefSeq (mRNA)	NM_005543; NM_001265587	NM_013564
RefSeq (protein)	NP_001252516; NP_005534	NP_038592
Location (UCSC)	Chr 19: 17.82 – 17.82 Mb	Chr 8: 72.14 – 72.14 Mb
PubMed search
- Wikidata
View/Edit Human	View/Edit Mouse

Insulin-like 3 is a protein that in humans is encoded by the INSL3 gene.

== Function ==
The protein encoded by this gene is an insulin like hormone produced mainly in gonadal tissues in males and females. Studies of the mouse counterpart suggest that this gene may be involved in the development of urogenital tract and female fertility. INSL-3 initiates meiotic progression in follicle-enclosed oocytes by mediating a reduction in intra-oocyte cAMP concentration by activating leucine-rich repeat-containing G protein-coupled receptor 8 (LGR8). It may also act as a hormone to regulate growth and differentiation of gubernaculum, and thus mediating intra-abdominal testicular descent. The mutations in this gene may lead to, but not a frequent cause of, cryptorchidism.
