= Posterior sacroiliac ligament =

Pelvic ligament connecting the sacrum and hip bone

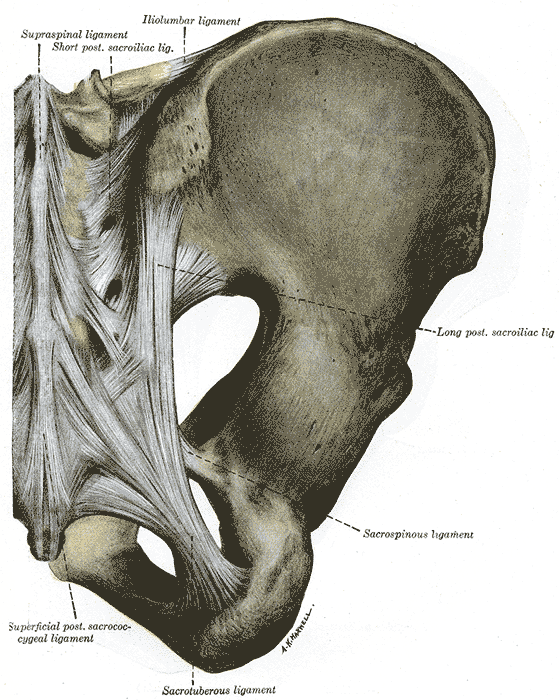
- Articulations of pelvis. Posterior view. (Short post. sacroiliac ligament labeled at upper left; long post. sacroiliac ligament labeled at center right.)

Details

Identifiers
- Latin: ligamentum sacroiliacum posterius
- TA98: A03.6.03.004
- TA2: 1864
- FMA: 21468

The posterior sacroiliac ligament is situated in a deep depression between the sacrum and ilium behind; it is strong and forms the chief bond of union between the bones.

It consists of numerous fasciculi, which pass between the bones in various directions.

- The upper part (short posterior sacroiliac ligament) is nearly horizontal in direction, and pass from the first and second transverse tubercles on the back of the sacrum to the tuberosity of the ilium.
- The lower part (long posterior sacroiliac ligament) is oblique in direction; it is attached by one extremity to the third transverse tubercle of the back of the sacrum, and by the other to the posterior superior spine of the ilium.

== See also ==
- Anterior sacroiliac ligament
