= Spinal disease =

Disease involving the vertebral column

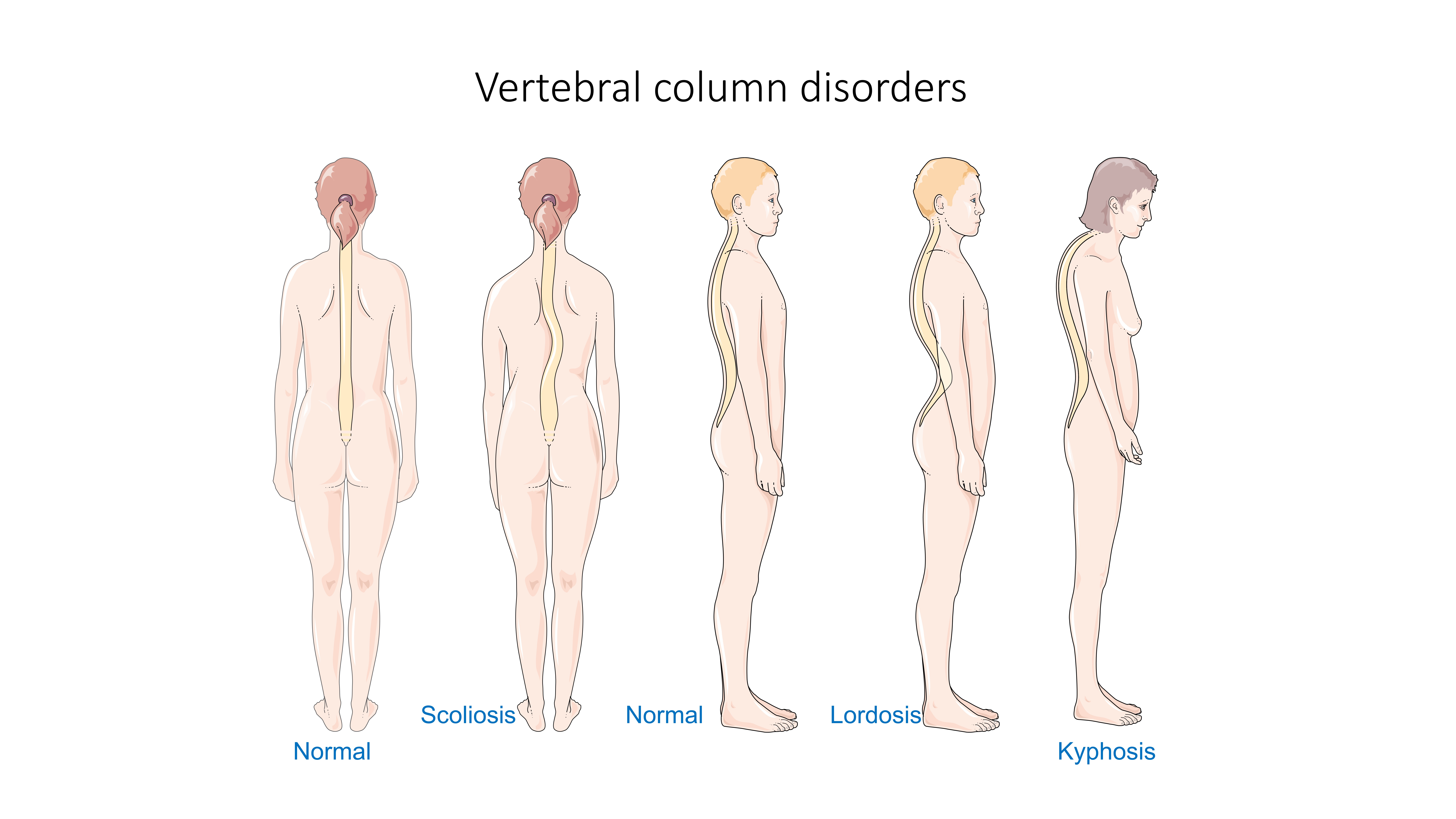
Skeleton and bones – Vertebral column disorders – Normal Scoliosis Normal Lordosis Kyphosis

Spinal disease refers to a condition impairing the backbone. These include various diseases of the back or spine ("dorso-"), such as kyphosis. Dorsalgia refers to back pain. Some other spinal diseases include spinal muscular atrophy, ankylosing spondylitis, scoliosis, lumbar spinal stenosis, spina bifida, spinal tumors, osteoporosis and cauda equina syndrome.

== Types ==
There are many recognized spinal diseases, some more common than others. Spinal disease also includes cervical spine diseases, which are diseases in the vertebrae of the neck. A lot of flexibility exists within the cervical spine and because of that, it is common for an individual to damage that area, especially over a long period of time. Some of the common cervical spine diseases include degenerative disc disease, cervical stenosis, and cervical disc herniation. Degenerative disc disease occurs over time when the discs within each vertebra in the neck begin to fall apart and begin to disintegrate. Because each vertebra can cause pain in different areas of the body, the pain from the disease can be sensed in the back, leg, neck area, or even the arms. When the spinal canal begins to lose its gap and gets thinner, it can cause pain in the neck, which can also cause a numb feeling in the arms and hands. Those are symptoms of cervical stenosis disease. The discs between each vertebra have fibers that can begin to deteriorate, and this can occur in cervical disc herniation. This disease is less common in younger people as it is usually a function of aging.

=== Spinal muscular atrophy (SMA) ===
==== SMA types ====
SMA is a category of spinal disease that in linked with genetic disorders. More specifically, it is caused by an autosomal recessive disorder due to a homozygous mutation of a motor neuron gene. There are different types of SMA. Type 0 is diagnosed to newborns who have muscle weakness, and little to no "fetal movements." Those who have type 0 also have other health issues, most of which are respiratory-related. SMA type 1 is diagnosed to infants with symptoms similar to that of type 0. Those who have type 1 are more likely to have trouble swallowing, controlling the tongue, and sitting up on their own. Moreover, infants with type 1 are likely to develop respiratory issues. Additionally, their thinking and comprehension is unaffected and they are conscientiousness. SMA type 2 is diagnosed to young children. Unlike those with type 1, these children can sit without assistance, but are unable to walk. This type mostly concerns the legs and arms. Some other problems that SMA type 2 patients might encounter are orthopedic, bone, and joint complications. SMA type 3 is typically diagnosed to kids and adults. Those with SMA 3 might be able to walk, and are more likely to experience weakness in the legs compared to the arms. Type 3 patients are most likely to have symptoms of scoliosis with little to no respiratory issues. Unlike types 0, 1, and 2, those with type 3 do not have to worry about comprehension and learning. Lastly, SMA type 4 is diagnosed to elderly individuals, and is the most uncommon version of SMA next to type 0. SMA type 4 is the least severe, and is sort of similar to type 3, but most common in adults.

==== Diagnosing SMA ====
Molecular look into spinal muscular atrophy.

Molecular genetic testing is the tool used to assess SMA. However, this test might not be needed if signs such as hypotonia are present. MRI scans and muscle biopsies used to be the standard testing method, but molecular testing is much more efficient. There are advanced forms of SMA that require other testing concerning the peripheral nervous system. On another note, SMA is due to the malfunctioning SMN1 gene. Patients who have SMA that is caused by the SMN gene is likely due to the compound heterozygotes with only one of the SMN1 genes being mutated. SMA is diagnosed by the deletion of the homozygous SMN1, while the severity is based on the SMN2 gene. Medical screenings, such as scans, should only be used for patients who "are negative for both SMN1 deletion and SMN1 mutation testing."

==== Management ====
As of right now, there are no successful treatments. However, many patients opt to go into physical and rehabilitation therapy designed to help with specific needs, similar to Schroth therapy. The most important and best way to manage SMA is to come up with a plan that both the medical team and patient agrees with. As mentioned before, patients with SMA also suffer from respiratory issues, which is the number one issue that must be prevented. Treating patients while they actively have the issues is not as effective as planning beforehand. It is also important for SMA patients to consider vaccinations as that could aid in the prevention of developing harmful respiratory problems. Some patients choose to use ventilation and other pulmonary-related tools. Taking care of gastrointestinal health is also important, as such issues are also common with SMA patients. Additionally, SMA patients might use G-tubes, also known as gastronomy tubes for feeding. Overall, the best treatment method is to find a plan that works with both the doctors and the patient to ensure that future problems are prevented and handled properly before becoming too severe.

=== Scoliosis ===
Scoliosis is a common spinal disease in which the spine has a curvature usually in the shape of the letter "C" or "S". This is most common in girls, but there is no specific cause for scoliosis. Only a few symptoms occur for one with this disease, which include feeling tired in the spinal region or backaches. Generally, if the hips or shoulders are uneven, or if the spine curves, it is due to scoliosis and should be seen by a doctor. When assessing scoliosis, it is important for the physician to assess for neurological issues. Anything from weakness, difficulty with balance and coordination, and bladder and bowel problems should be considered. Curvature advancement is largely dependent "on remaining spinal growth," as well as signs of puberty, indicating the beginning of early adulthood.

==== Diagnosis ====
Physicians must perform physical and neurological examinations, which includes looking at height, asymmetry in the back, chest, ribs, and other areas of the torso, balance and coordination, and even pain. In addition to physical examinations, physicians may order X-ray or MRI scans. These tests will verify any concerns.

==== Management ====
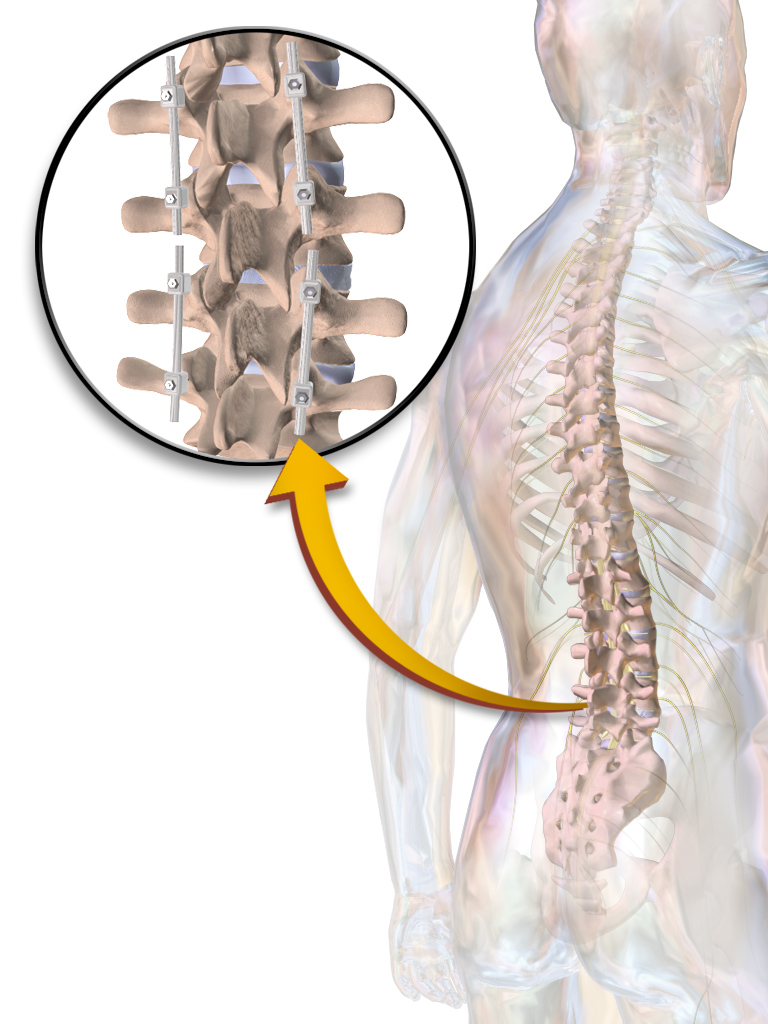
Spinal fusion surgery.

Depending on the level of curvature, there are different treatment options. For those who have curves less than 10 degrees, there is no need to get into treatment. Curves between 10–25 degrees must keep a close eye on it by having X-rays to maintain it. However, those who have curves greater than 25 degrees, but less than 40 to 45 might choose to get bracing. Braces, also known as corsets, hold the spine in a specific position from the outside. These devices are tight, and can get even tighter with the straps. Whether bracing is effective or not is still studied today. In addition to bracing, many patients choose to partake in hydrotherapy. Studies show that water environment positively affects the curvature of different types, and increases mobility as well as flexibility in the shoulders and bending. There are also other physical therapy methods to improving curvature through Schroth therapy. Some experiments have been conducted to determine whether or not this strategy is useful. One study done shows that the Schroth group had improved posture, while the control worsened. Another double-blind experiment was conducted, which did not show outstanding results. The very last treatment option is surgery. There are certain goals that surgery aims to reach. For children, the point of the operation is to stop the curve from getting worse and minimize spinal deformity. On the other hand, adults usually have this surgery due to nerve damage, or if they have serious bladder and bowel issues. Surgery is only recommended to those who have curves greater than 40–50 degrees. There have been some experiments done to determine which surgical method is the most beneficial. One study shows that those who have short segment decompression/ fusion are least likely to suffer from postoperative complications. Moreover, short segment patients had a shorter hospital stay compared to long segment. However, the short segment group did lose more blood, resulting in less blood volume after their operation.

=== Lumbar spinal stenosis ===
Lumbar spinal stenosis is classified as a narrowing of the spinal canal in the lumbar region of the vertebrae. This may lead to compression of the nerve root of the spinal cord and result in pain of the lower back and lower extremities. Other symptoms include impaired walking and a slightly stooped posture due to loss of disc height and bulging of the disc. Lumbar spinal stenosis is very prevalent with 9.3% of the general population producing symptoms and the number is continuing to rise in patients older than 60. It's generally an indication for spinal surgery in patients older than 65 years of age. However, there is a myth and fear among most patients that only surgery is the cure for such conditions and spine surgery is very risky. There are many non-surgical treatments available to prevent, halt and even reverse many spine diseases. Also, some surgery patients can be operated on in a daycare procedure or with minimum length of stay in hospital, with statistically good outcomes.

=== Spina bifida ===
Spina bifida is the most common defect impacting the Central Nervous System (CNS). The most common and most severe form of Spina Bifida is Myelomeningocele. Individuals with Myelomeningocele are born with an incompletely fused spine, and therefore exposing the spinal cord through an opening in the back. In general, the higher the spinal lesion, the greater the functional impairment to the individual. Symptoms may include bowel and bladder problems, weakness and/or loss of sensation below the level of the lesion, paralysis, or orthopedic issues. Severity of symptoms can vary per situation.

=== Cauda equina syndrome ===
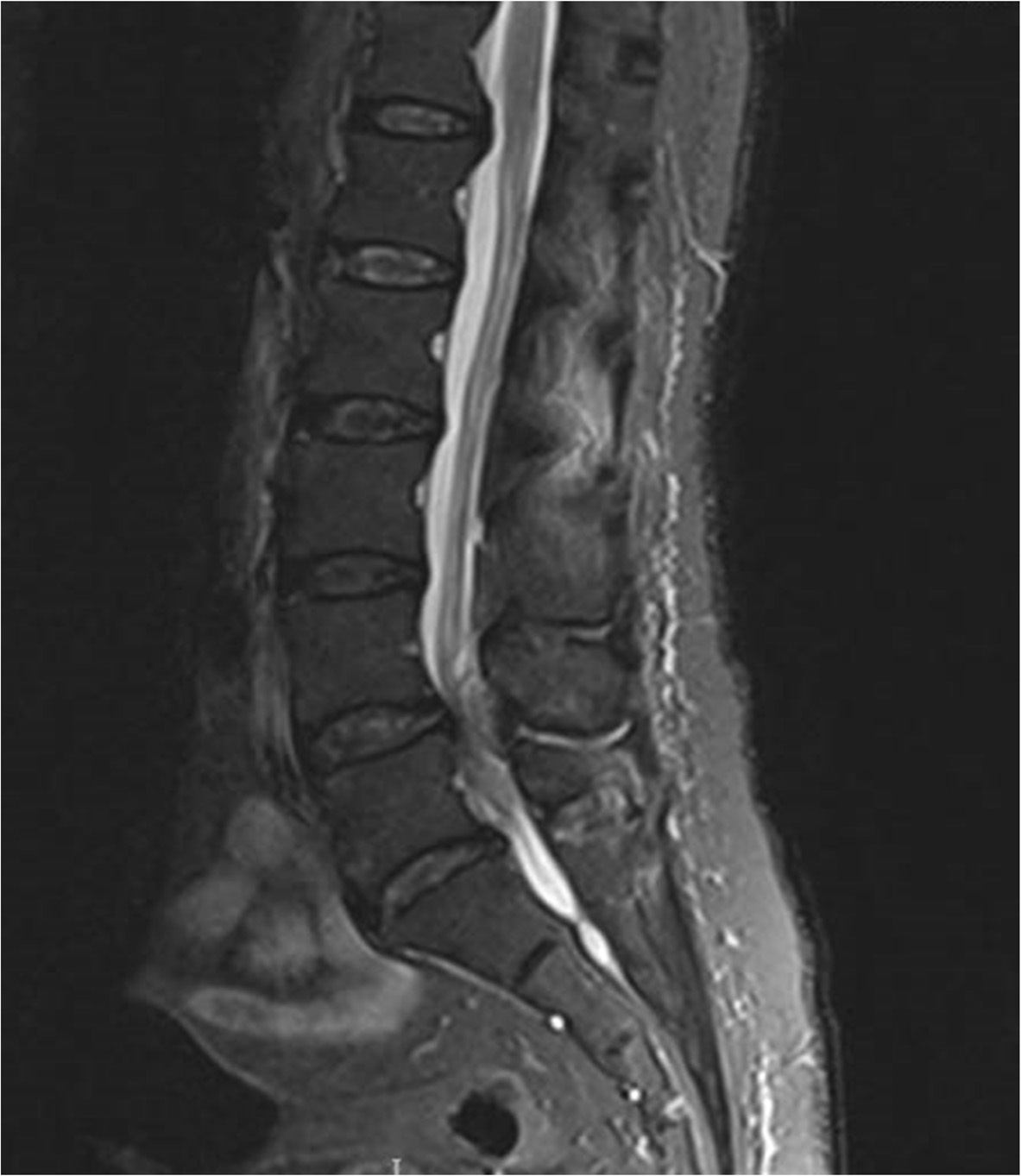
An MRI of the lumbar spine with abscess that resulted in CES.

Cauda equina syndrome is a rare syndrome that affects the spinal nerves in the region of the lower back called the cauda equine (Latin for "horses tail"). Injury to the cauda equina can have long lasting ramifications for the individual. Symptoms include lower back pain, bladder disturbances, bowel dysfunction, and anesthesia or paresthesia between the thighs. In order to prevent progressive neurological changes surgery can be a viable option. CT scans, myelograms, and MRIs are used to diagnose cauda equina.

==== Management ====
Surgery is the best treatment option for those who have CES. If left untreated, patients might develop paralysis and bladder incontinence. Moreover, the timing of the surgery is crucial, but it is unknown as to when the best time to have it done is. When it comes to timing, it really depends on when the patients' symptoms first arise. Most patients start considering surgery when the symptoms such as bladder incontinence, bowel movement issues, limb weakness, and pain first begin. The most common surgical procedure is a laminectomy, with microdiscectomies and discectomies also being options. With the lack of research regarding this spinal disorder, however, it is unclear as to when the best time have the operation is. One study shows that overnight versus daytime lumbar decompression surgery does not have much significance in terms of complications. However, those who do have overnight surgery are more likely to suffer from complications.

=== Tumors ===
A spinal tumor is when unusual tissue begins growing and spreading in the spinal columns or spinal cords. The unusual tissue builds up from abnormal cells that multiply quickly in a specific region. Tumors generally are broken down into categories known as benign, meaning non-cancerous, or malignant, meaning cancerous, and also primary or secondary. Primary spinal tumors begin in either the spinal cord or spinal column, whereas secondary spinal tumors begin elsewhere and spread to the spinal region. Symptoms for spinal tumors may vary due to factors such as the type of tumor, the region of the spine, and the health of the patient. Back pain is the most common symptom and it can be a problem if the pain is severe, has a time frame that lasts longer than it would for a normal injury, and becomes worse while laying down or at rest. Other symptoms, excluding back pains, are loss of muscle function, loss of bowel or bladder function, pain in the legs, scoliosis, or even unusual sensations in the legs. The primary tumor has no known cause, although there are possible answers that scientists have researched. Cancer may be linked to genes because research shows that in certain families, the incidents of spinal tumors are higher. Two of the genetic disorders that may affect spinal tumors, include Von Hippel-Lindau disease and Neurofibromatosis 2. Von Hippel-Lindau disease is a non-cancerous tumor of blood vessels that occur in the brain, spinal cord, or even tumors in the kidneys. The Neurofibromatosis 2 is a non-cancerous tumor that usually affects the nerves for hearing. Loss of hearing in one or both ears, is a common effect of this genetic disorder.
