= Internal vertebral venous plexuses =

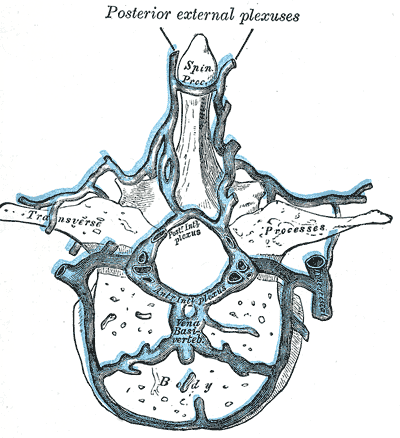
- Transverse section of a thoracic vertebra, showing the vertebral venous plexuses.

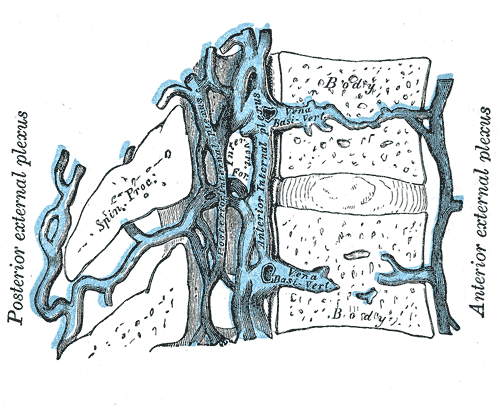
- Median sagittal section of two thoracic vertebrae, showing the vertebral venous plexuses.

Details

Identifiers
- Latin: plexus venosi vertebrales interni
- TA98: A12.3.07.021; A12.3.07.026
- TA2: 4947, 4949
- FMA: 4881

The internal vertebral venous plexuses (intraspinal veins) lie within the vertebral canal in the epidural space, embedded within epidural fat. They receive tributaries from bones, red bone marrow, and spinal cord. They are arranged into four interconnected, vertically oriented vessels - two situated anteriorly, and two posteriorly:

- The anterior internal vertebral venous plexus consists of two large plexiform veins situated upon the posterior surfaces of the vertebral bodies and intervertebral discs on either side of the posterior longitudinal ligament (underneath this ligament they are interconnected by transverse branches into which the basivertebral veins open).
- The posterior internal vertebral venous plexus consists of two veins situated - one on either side - upon the anterior aspect of the vertebral arches and ligamenta flava. They form anastomoses with posterior external plexuses by way of veins passing through or between the ligamenta flava.

The anterior and posterior internal plexuses communicate via a series of venous rings - one near each vertebra. Due to these interconnections, the anterior and posterior internal plexuses were formerly considered a single vascular unit - the retia venosa vertebrarum.

== Anatomy ==
The internal vertebral venous plexuses are composed of valveless veins. They form a denser vascular network than the external vertebral venous plexuses.

The basivertebral veins are the main tributaries of the plexus.

=== Anastomoses ===
They forms venous anastomoses through intervertebral foramina by way of intervertebral veins at all vertebral levels.

Around the foramen magnum, they form a dense venous network with the vertebral veins, sigmoid sinuses, occipital sinuses, the basilar plexus, the condyloid emissary veins, and the rete canalis hypoglossi.

The Batson venous plexus, which communicates the posterior intercostal vessels with the vertebral plexus, lacks valves so blood can flow in both directions. The clinical importance of this venous communication is that it represents an important phase in the establishment of vertebral metastases and neuroschistomiasis.
