= Interspinous ligament =

Ligament of the spine

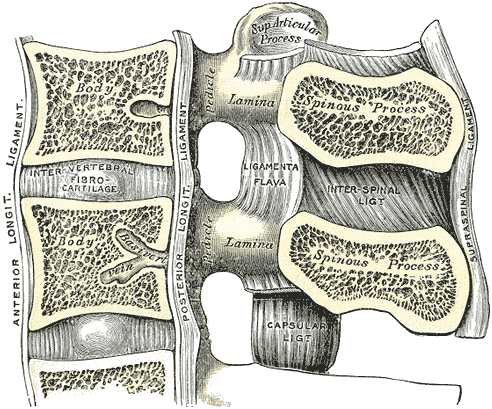
- Median sagittal section of two lumbar vertebrae and their ligaments (interspinous ligament visible at center right)

Details
- From: Spinous process of vertebra
- To: Spinous process of vertebra

Identifiers
- Latin: ligamenta interspinalia
- TA98: A03.2.01.002
- TA2: 1674
- FMA: 71392

The interspinous ligaments (interspinal ligaments) are thin, membranous ligaments that connect adjoining spinous processes of the vertebra in the spine. They take the form of relatively weak sheets of fibrous tissue and are well developed only in the lumbar region.

They extend from the root to the apex of each spinous process. They meet the ligamenta flava anteriorly, and blend with the supraspinous ligament posteriorly at the apexes of the spinal processes. The function of the interspinous ligaments is to limit ventral flexion of the spine and sliding movement of the vertebrae.

The ligaments are narrow and elongated in the thoracic region. They are broader, thicker, and quadrilateral in form in the lumbar region. They are only slightly developed in the neck; in the neck, they are often considered part of the nuchal ligament.
