= Spinal veins =

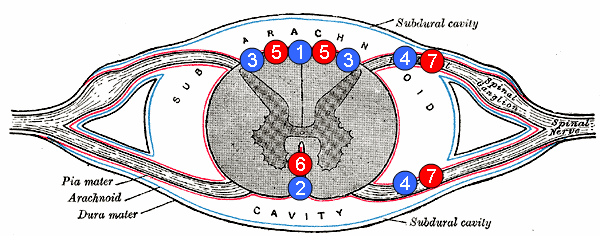
- 1: Posterior spinal vein 2: anterior spinal vein 3: posterolateral spinal vein 4: radicular (or segmental medullary) vein 5: posterior spinal arteries 6: anterior spinal artery 7: radicular (or segmental medullary) artery

Details
- Drains to: Intervertebral veins

Identifiers
- Latin: venae spinales
- TA98: A12.3.07.023
- FMA: 71580

The spinal veins (veins of the medulla spinalis or veins of the spinal cord) are situated in the pia mater and form a minute, tortuous, venous plexus.

They emerge chiefly from the median fissures of the medulla spinalis and are largest in the lumbar region.

In this plexus there are:

- (1) two median longitudinal veins, one in front of the anterior fissure, and the other behind the posterior sulcus of the cord.
- (2) four lateral longitudinal veins which run behind the nerve roots.

They end in the intervertebral veins.

Near the base of the skull they unite, and form two or three small trunks, which communicate with the vertebral veins, and then end in the inferior cerebellar veins, or in the inferior petrosal sinuses.
