= Spinal column =

Bony structure found in vertebrates

- The human spinal column and its regions

- Vertebral column of a goat

Details

Identifiers
- Latin: columna vertebralis

The spinal column, also known as the vertebral column, spine or backbone, is the core part of the axial skeleton in vertebrates. The vertebral column is the defining and eponymous characteristic of the vertebrate. The spinal column is a segmented column of vertebrae that surrounds and protects the spinal cord. The vertebrae are separated by intervertebral discs in a series of cartilaginous joints. The dorsal portion of the spinal column houses the spinal canal, an elongated cavity formed by the alignment of the vertebral neural arches that encloses and protects the spinal cord, with spinal nerves exiting via the intervertebral foramina to innervate each body segment.

There are around 50,000 species of animals that have a vertebral column. The human spine is one of the most-studied examples, as the general structure of human vertebrae is fairly typical of that found in other mammals, reptiles, and birds. The shape of the vertebral body does, however, vary somewhat between different groups of living species.

Individual vertebrae are named according to their corresponding region including the neck, thorax, abdomen, pelvis or tail. In clinical medicine, features on vertebrae such as the spinous process can be used as surface landmarks to guide medical procedures such as lumbar punctures and spinal anesthesia. There are also many different spinal diseases in humans that can affect both the bony vertebrae and the intervertebral discs, with kyphosis, scoliosis, ankylosing spondylitis, and degenerative discs being recognizable examples. Spina bifida is the most common birth defect that affects the spinal column.

== Structure ==
The number of vertebrae in a region can vary but overall the number remains the same. In a human spinal column, there are normally 33 vertebrae. The upper 24 pre-sacral vertebrae are articulating and separated from each other by intervertebral discs, and the lower nine are fused in adults, five in the sacrum and four in the coccyx, or tailbone. The articulating vertebrae are named according to their region of the spine.

From top to bottom, there are 7 cervical vertebrae, 12 thoracic vertebrae and 5 lumbar vertebrae. The number of those in the cervical region, however, is only rarely changed, while that in the coccygeal region varies most. Excluding rare deviations, the total number of vertebrae ranges from 32 to 35. In about 10% of people, both the total number of pre-sacral vertebrae and the number of vertebrae in individual parts of the spine can vary. The most frequent deviations are: 11 (rarely 13) thoracic vertebrae, 4 or 6 lumbar vertebrae, 3 or 5 coccygeal vertebrae (rarely up to 7).

There are numerous ligaments extending the length of the column, which include the anterior and posterior longitudinal ligaments at the front and back of the vertebral bodies, the ligamentum flavum deep to the laminae, the interspinous and supraspinous ligaments between spinous processes, and the intertransverse ligaments between the transverse processes.

=== Vertebrae ===
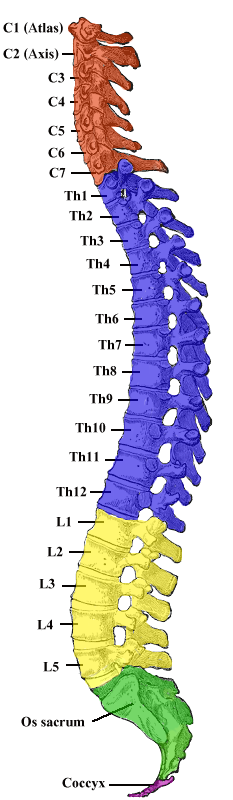
A dermatome is an area of the skin that sends sensory messages to a specific spinal nerve (right). The effects of a spinal cord injury depend on the level along the spinal column (left). S1-S5 are part of the os sacrum.
Spinal nerves exit the spinal cord between each pair of vertebrae.

The vertebrae in the human vertebral column is divided into different body regions, which correspond to the curvatures of the vertebral column. The articulating vertebrae are named according to their region of the spine. Vertebrae in these regions are essentially alike, with minor variation. These regions are called the cervical spine, thoracic spine, lumbar spine, sacrum, and coccyx.

The number of vertebrae in a region can vary but overall the number remains the same. The number of those in the cervical region, however, is only rarely changed. The vertebrae of the cervical, thoracic, and lumbar spines are independent bones and generally quite similar. The vertebrae of the sacrum and coccyx are usually fused and unable to move independently. Two special vertebrae are the atlas and axis, on which the head rests.

Anatomy of a vertebra

A typical vertebra consists of two parts: the vertebral body (or centrum), which is ventral (or anterior, in the standard anatomical position) and withstands axial structural load; and the vertebral arch (also known as neural arch), which is dorsal (or posterior) and provides articulations and anchorages for ribs and core skeletal muscles. Together, these enclose the vertebral foramen, the series of which align to form the spinal canal, a body cavity that contains the spinal cord. Because the vertebral column will outgrow the spinal cord during child development, by adulthood the spinal cord often ends at the upper lumbar spine (at around L1/L2 level), the lower (caudal) end of the spinal canal is occupied by a ponytail-like bundle of spinal nerves descriptively called cauda equina (from Latin "horse's tail"), and the sacrum and coccyx are fused without a central foramen.

The vertebral arch is formed by a ventral pair of pedicles and a dorsal pair of laminae, and supports seven processes, four articular, two transverse and one spinous, the latter also being known as the neural spine. The transverse and spinous processes and their associated ligaments serve as important attachment sites for back and paraspinal muscles and the thoracolumbar fasciae. The spinous processes of the cervical and lumbar regions can be felt through the skin, and are important surface landmarks in clinical medicine.

The four articular processes for two pairs of plane facet joints above and below each vertebra, articulating with those of the adjacent vertebrae and are joined by a thin portion of the neural arch called the pars interarticularis. The orientation of the facet joints restricts the range of motion between the vertebrae. Underneath each pedicle is a small hole (enclosed by the pedicle of the vertebral below) called intervertebral foramen, which transmit the corresponding spinal nerve and dorsal root ganglion that exit the spinal canal.

From top to bottom, the vertebrae are:

- Cervical spine (neck): 7 vertebrae (C1–C7)
- Thoracic spine (chest/upper back): 12 vertebrae (T1–T12)
- Lumbar spine (lower back): 5 vertebrae (L1–L5)
- Sacrum (pelvis region): 5 (fused) vertebrae (S1–S5)
- Coccyx (tailbone): 4 (3–5, fused) vertebrae

==== Combined vertebral regions ====
For some medical purposes, adjacent vertebral regions may be considered together:

- Cervicothoracic spine (or region or division): the combined region of the cervical vertebrae and the thoracic vertebrae
- Thoracolumbar spine (or region or division): the combined region of the thoracic vertebrae and the lumbar vertebrae
- Lumbosacral spine (or region or division): the combined region of the lumbar vertebrae and the sacral vertebrae

=== Shape ===
The vertebral column is curved in several places, a result of human bipedal evolution. These curves increase the vertebral column's strength, flexibility, and ability to absorb shock, stabilising the body in upright position. When the load on the spine is increased, the curvatures increase in depth (become more curved) to accommodate the extra weight. They then spring back when the weight is removed.

The upper cervical spine has a curve, convex forward, that begins at the axis (second cervical vertebra) at the apex of the odontoid process or dens and ends at the middle of the second thoracic vertebra; it is the least marked of all the curves. This inward curve is known as a lordotic curve.

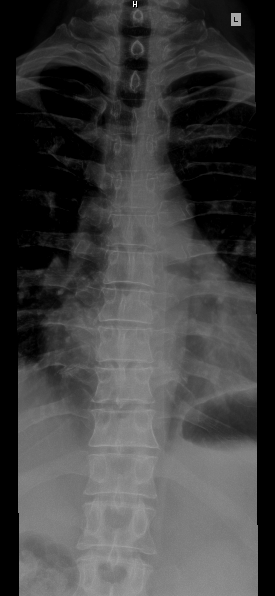
A thoracic spine X-ray of a 57-year-old male.

The thoracic curve, concave forward, begins at the middle of the second and ends at the middle of the twelfth thoracic vertebra. Its most prominent point behind corresponds to the spinous process of the seventh thoracic vertebra. This curve is known as a kyphotic curve.

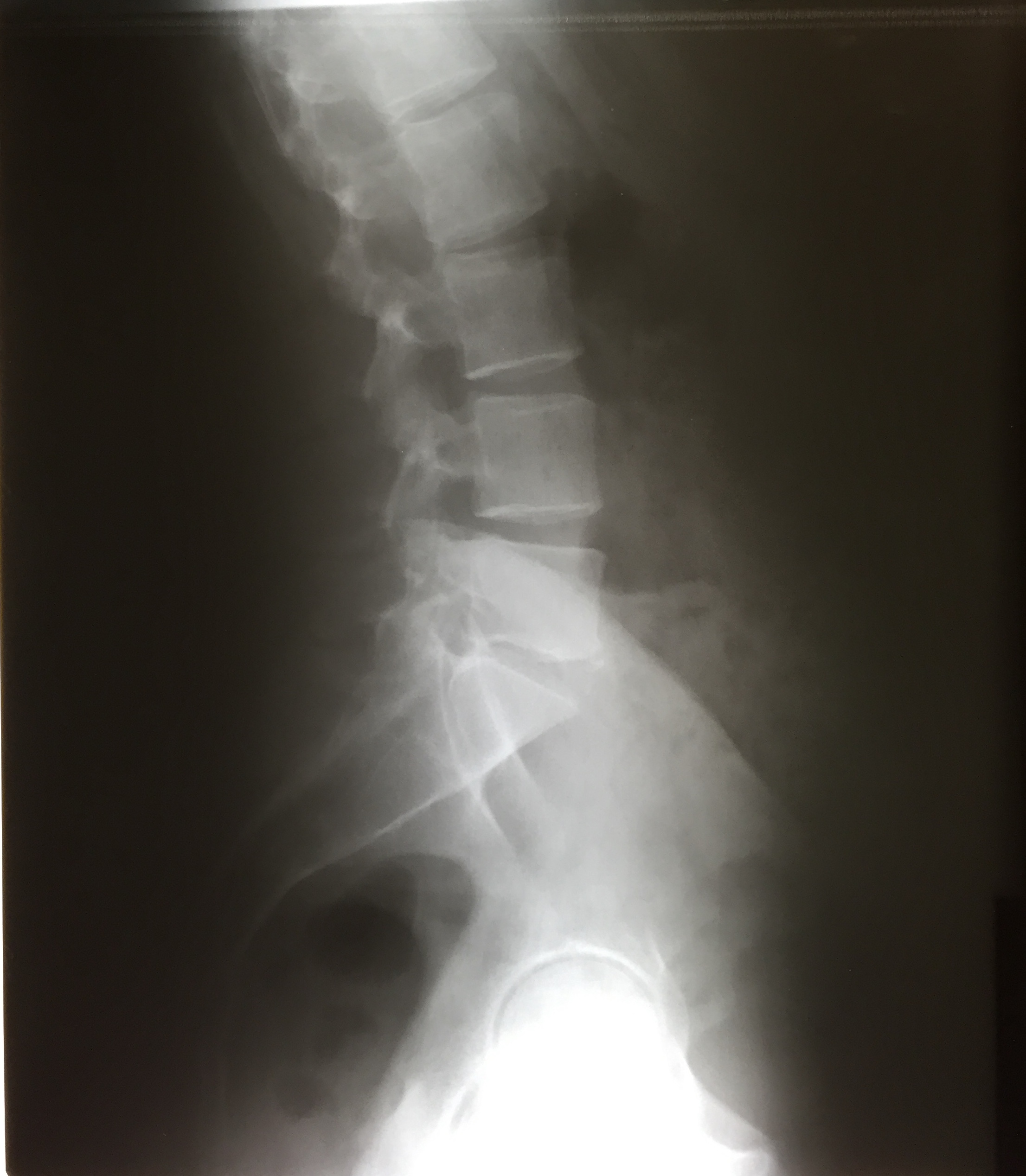
Lateral lumbar X-ray of a 34-year-old male

The lumbar curve is more marked in the female than in the male; it begins at the middle of the last thoracic vertebra, and ends at the sacrovertebral angle. It is convex anteriorly, the convexity of the lower three vertebrae being much greater than that of the upper two. This curve is described as a lordotic curve.

The sacral curve begins at the sacrovertebral articulation, and ends at the point of the coccyx; its concavity is directed downward and forward as a kyphotic curve.

The thoracic and sacral kyphotic curves are termed primary curves, because they are present in the fetus. The cervical and lumbar curves are compensatory, or secondary, and are developed after birth. The cervical curve forms when the infant is able to hold up its head (at three or four months) and sit upright (at nine months). The lumbar curve forms later from twelve to eighteen months, when the child begins to walk.

=== Surfaces ===
Anterior surface

When viewed from in front, the width of the bodies of the vertebrae is seen to increase from the second cervical to the first thoracic; there is then a slight diminution in the next three vertebrae. Below this, there is again a gradual and progressive increase in width as low as the sacrovertebral angle. From this point there is a rapid diminution, to the apex of the coccyx.

Posterior surface

From behind, the vertebral column presents in the median line the spinous processes. In the cervical region (with the exception of the second and seventh vertebrae), these are short, horizontal, and bifid. In the upper part of the thoracic region they are directed obliquely downward; in the middle they are almost vertical, and in the lower part they are nearly horizontal. In the lumbar region they are nearly horizontal. The spinous processes are separated by considerable intervals in the lumbar region, by narrower intervals in the neck, and are closely approximated in the middle of the thoracic region. Occasionally one of these processes deviates a little from the median line — which can sometimes be indicative of a fracture or a displacement of the spine. On either side of the spinous processes is the vertebral groove formed by the laminae in the cervical and lumbar regions, where it is shallow, and by the laminae and transverse processes in the thoracic region, where it is deep and broad; these grooves lodge the deep muscles of the back. Lateral to the spinous processes are the articular processes, and still more laterally the transverse processes. In the thoracic region, the transverse processes stand backward, on a plane considerably behind that of the same processes in the cervical and lumbar regions. In the cervical region, the transverse processes are placed in front of the articular processes, lateral to the pedicles and between the intervertebral foramina. In the thoracic region they are posterior to the pedicles, intervertebral foramina, and articular processes. In the lumbar region they are in front of the articular processes, but behind the intervertebral foramina.

Lateral surfaces

The sides of the vertebral column are separated from the posterior surface by the articular processes in the cervical and thoracic regions and by the transverse processes in the lumbar region. In the thoracic region, the sides of the bodies of the vertebrae are marked in the back by the facets for articulation with the heads of the ribs. More posteriorly are the intervertebral foramina, formed by the juxtaposition of the vertebral notches, oval in shape, smallest in the cervical and upper part of the thoracic regions and gradually increasing in size to the last lumbar. They transmit the special spinal nerves and are situated between the transverse processes in the cervical region and in front of them, in the thoracic and lumbar regions.

== Ligaments ==
There are different ligaments involved in the holding together of the vertebrae in the column, and in the column's movement. The anterior and posterior longitudinal ligaments extend the length of the vertebral column along the front and back of the vertebral bodies. The interspinous ligaments connect the adjoining spinous processes of the vertebrae. The supraspinous ligament extends the length of the spine running along the back of the spinous processes, from the sacrum to the seventh cervical vertebra. From there it is continuous with the nuchal ligament.

== Development ==
The striking segmented pattern of the spine is established during embryogenesis when somites are rhythmically added to the posterior of the embryo. Somite formation begins around the third week when the embryo begins gastrulation and continues until all somites are formed. Their number varies between species: there are 42 to 44 somites in the human embryo and around 52 in the chick embryo. The somites are spheres, formed from the paraxial mesoderm that lies at the sides of the neural tube and they contain the precursors of spinal bone, the vertebrae ribs and some of the skull, as well as muscle, ligaments and skin. Somitogenesis and the subsequent distribution of somites is controlled by a clock and wavefront model acting in cells of the paraxial mesoderm. Soon after their formation, sclerotomes, which give rise to some of the bone of the skull, the vertebrae and ribs, migrate, leaving the remainder of the somite now termed a dermamyotome behind. This then splits to give the myotomes which will form the muscles and dermatomes which will form the skin of the back. Sclerotomes become subdivided into an anterior and a posterior compartment. This subdivision plays a key role in the definitive patterning of vertebrae that form when the posterior part of one somite fuses to the anterior part of the consecutive somite during a process termed resegmentation. Disruption of the somitogenesis process in humans results in diseases such as congenital scoliosis. So far, the human homologues of three genes associated to the mouse segmentation clock, (MESP2, DLL3 and LFNG), have been shown to be mutated in cases of congenital scoliosis, suggesting that the mechanisms involved in vertebral segmentation are conserved across vertebrates. In humans the first four somites are incorporated in the base of the occipital bone of the skull and the next 33 somites will form the vertebrae, ribs, muscles, ligaments and skin. The remaining posterior somites degenerate. During the fourth week of embryogenesis, the sclerotomes shift their position to surround the spinal cord and the notochord. This column of tissue has a segmented appearance, with alternating areas of dense and less dense areas.

As the sclerotome develops, it condenses further eventually developing into the vertebral body. Development of the appropriate shapes of the vertebral bodies is regulated by HOX genes.

The less dense tissue that separates the sclerotome segments develop into the intervertebral discs.

The notochord disappears in the sclerotome (vertebral body) segments but persists in the region of the intervertebral discs as the nucleus pulposus. The nucleus pulposus and the fibers of the anulus fibrosus make up the intervertebral disc.

The primary curves (thoracic and sacral curvatures) form during fetal development. The secondary curves develop after birth. The cervical curvature forms as a result of lifting the head and the lumbar curvature forms as a result of walking.

== Function ==
=== Spinal cord ===
The spinal cord nested in the vertebral column.

The vertebral column surrounds the spinal cord which travels within the spinal canal, formed from a central hole within each vertebra. The spinal cord is part of the central nervous system that supplies nerves and receives information from the peripheral nervous system within the body. The spinal cord consists of grey and white matter and a central cavity, the central canal. Adjacent to each vertebra emerge spinal nerves. The spinal nerves provide sympathetic nervous supply to the body, with nerves emerging forming the sympathetic trunk and the splanchnic nerves.

The spinal canal follows the different curves of the column; it is large and triangular in those parts of the column that enjoy the greatest freedom of movement, such as the cervical and lumbar regions, and is small and rounded in the thoracic region, where motion is more limited. The spinal cord terminates in the conus medullaris and cauda equina.

== Clinical significance ==
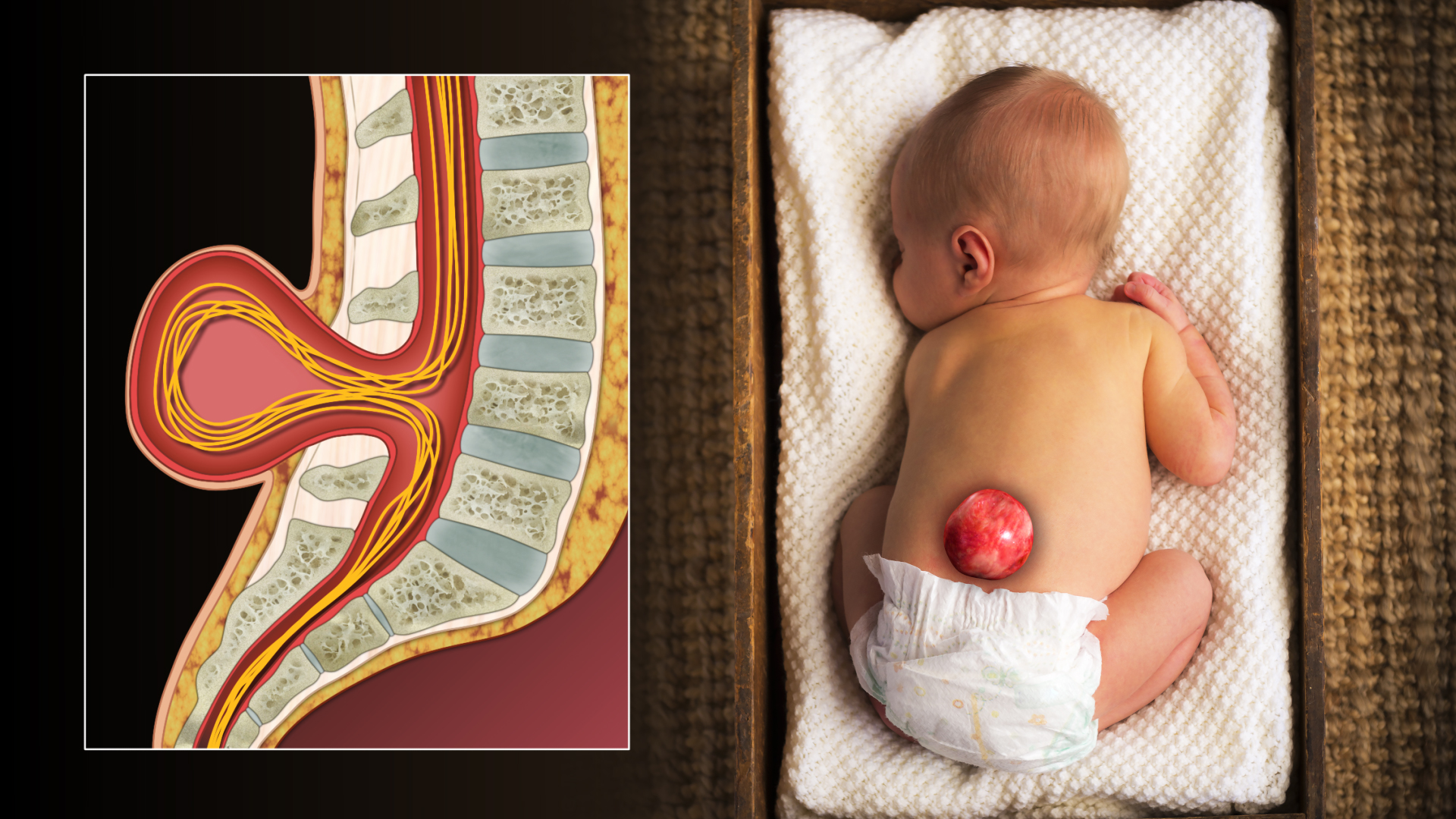
3D medical animation still shot of spina bifida

=== Disease ===
Spina bifida is a congenital disorder in which there is a defective closure of the vertebral arch. Sometimes the spinal meninges and also the spinal cord can protrude through this, and this is called spina bifida cystica. Where the condition does not involve this protrusion it is known as spina bifida occulta. Sometimes all of the vertebral arches may remain incomplete.

Another, though rare, congenital disease is Klippel–Feil syndrome, which is the fusion of any two of the cervical vertebrae.

Spondylolisthesis is the forward displacement of a vertebra and retrolisthesis is a posterior displacement of one vertebral body with respect to the adjacent vertebra to a degree less than a dislocation.

Spondylolysis, also known as a pars defect, is a defect or fracture at the pars interarticularis of the vertebral arch.

Spinal disc herniation, more commonly called a "slipped disc", is the result of a tear in the outer ring (anulus fibrosus) of the intervertebral disc, which lets some of the soft gel-like material, the nucleus pulposus, bulge out in a hernia.

Spinal stenosis is a narrowing of the spinal canal which can occur in any region of the spine though less commonly in the thoracic region. The stenosis can constrict the spinal canal giving rise to a neurological deficit.

Pain at the coccyx (tailbone) is known as coccydynia.

Spinal cord injury is damage to the spinal cord that causes changes in its function, either temporary or permanent. Spinal cord injuries can be divided into categories: complete transection, hemisection, central spinal cord lesions, posterior spinal cord lesions, and anterior spinal cord lesions.

Scalloping vertebrae is the increase in the concavity of the posterior vertebral body. It can be seen on lateral X-ray and sagittal views of CT and MRI scans. Its concavity is due to the increased pressure exerting on the vertebrae due to a mass. Internal spinal mass such as spinal astrocytoma, ependymoma, schwannoma, neurofibroma, and achondroplasia causes vertebrae scalloping.

=== Curvature ===
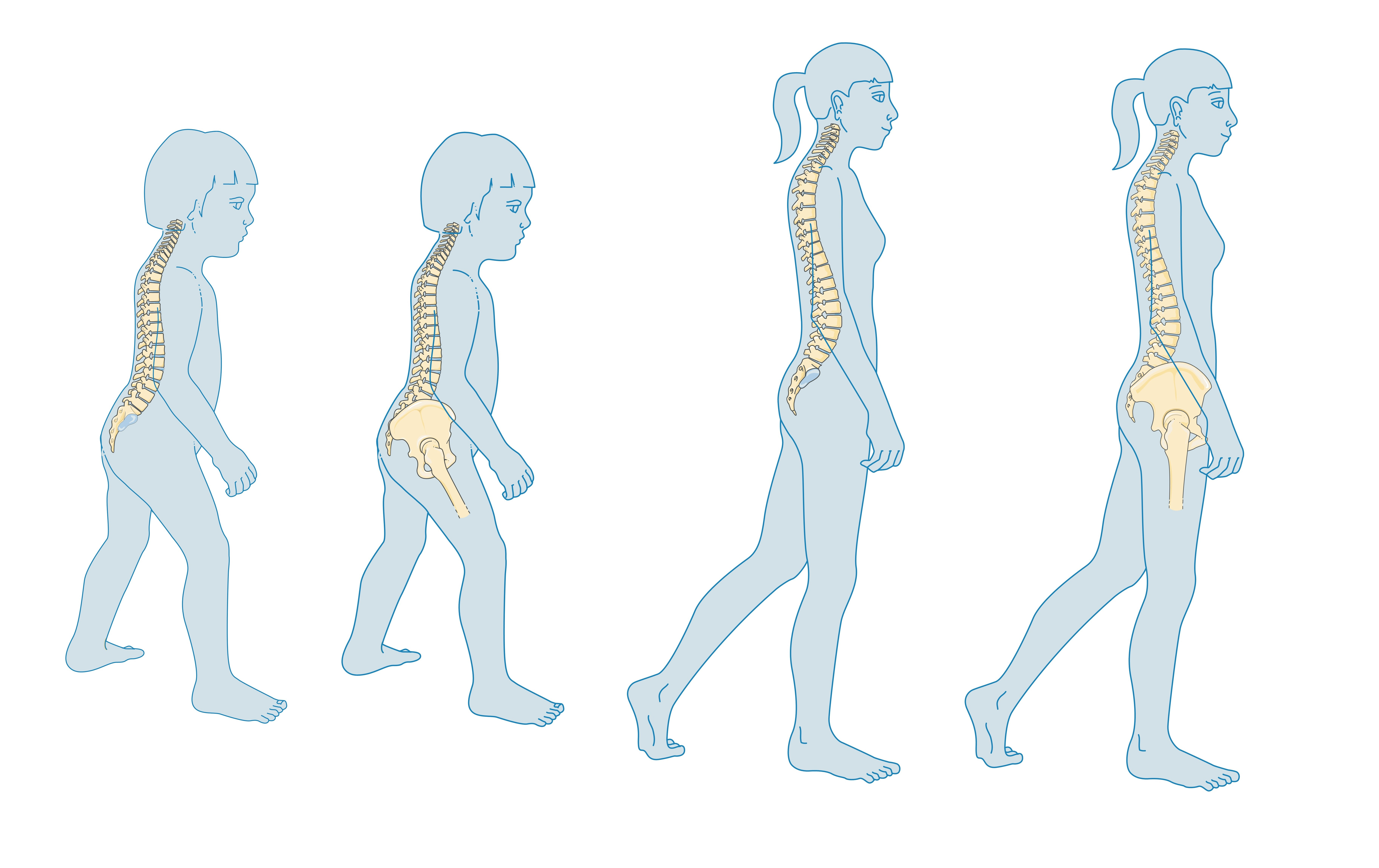
Diagram showing normal curvature of the vertebrae from childhood to teenage

Excessive or abnormal spinal curvature is classed as a spinal disease or dorsopathy and includes the following abnormal curvatures:

- Kyphosis is an exaggerated kyphotic (convex) curvature of the thoracic region in the sagittal plane, also called hyperkyphosis. This produces the so-called "humpback" or "dowager's hump", a condition commonly resulting from osteoporosis.
- Lordosis is an exaggerated lordotic (concave) curvature of the lumbar region in the sagittal plane, is known as lumbar hyperlordosis and also as "swayback". Temporary lordosis is common during pregnancy.
- Scoliosis, lateral curvature, is the most common abnormal curvature, occurring in 0.5% of the population. It is more common among females and may result from unequal growth of the two sides of one or more vertebrae, so that they do not fuse properly. It can also be caused by pulmonary atelectasis (partial or complete deflation of one or more lobes of the lungs) as observed in asthma or pneumothorax.
- Kyphoscoliosis, a combination of kyphosis and scoliosis.

=== Anatomical landmarks ===
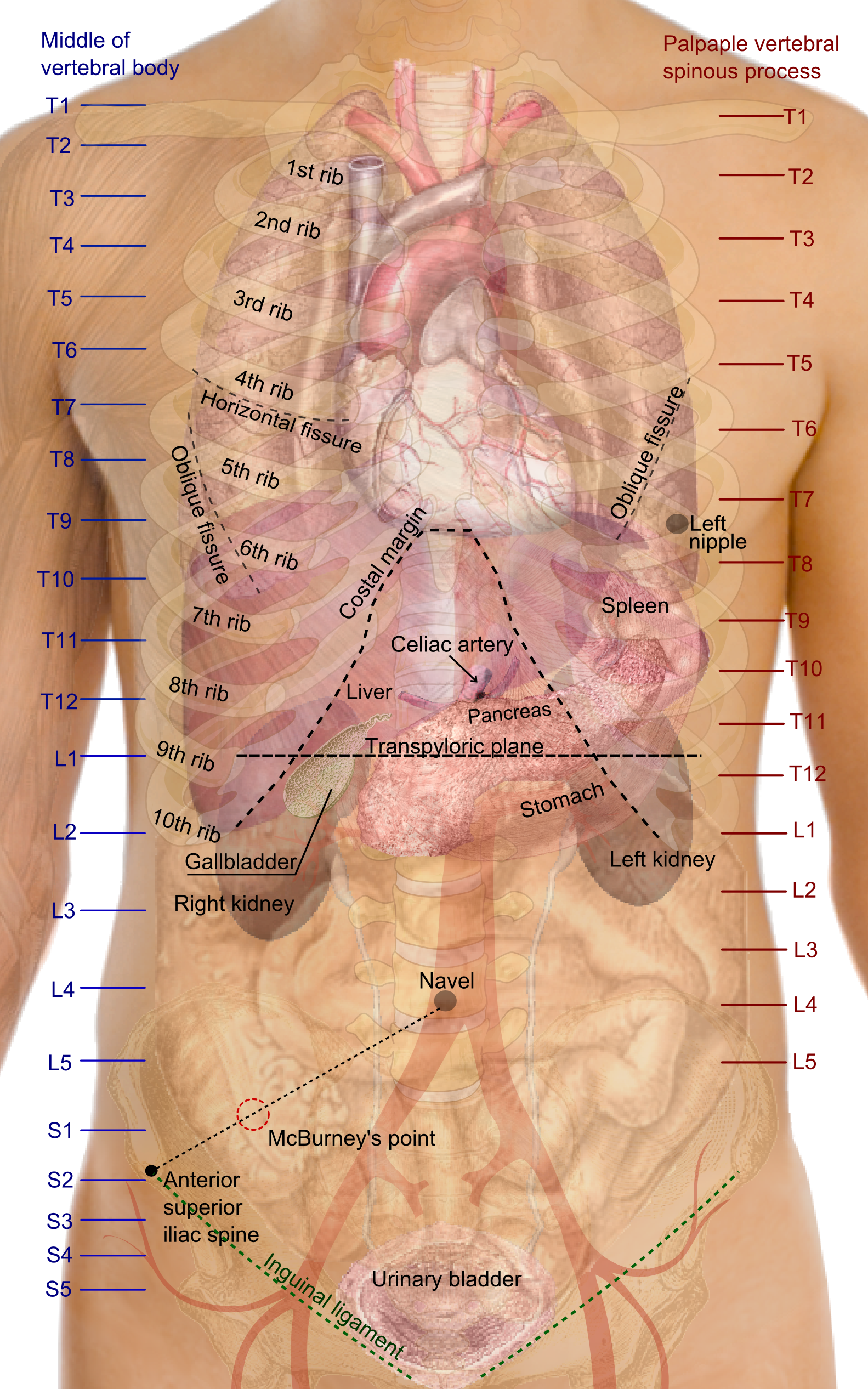
Surface projections of organs of the torso. The transpyloric line is seen at L1

Individual vertebrae of the human vertebral column can be felt and used as surface anatomy, with reference points are taken from the middle of the vertebral body. This provides anatomical landmarks that can be used to guide procedures such as a lumbar puncture and also as vertical reference points to describe the locations of other parts of human anatomy, such as the positions of organs.

== Other animals ==
=== Variations in vertebrae ===
The general structure of vertebrae in other animals is largely the same as in humans. Individual vertebrae are composed of a centrum (body), arches protruding from the top and bottom of the centrum, and various processes projecting from the centrum and/or arches. An arch extending from the top of the centrum is called a neural arch, while the haemal arch is found underneath the centrum in the caudal (tail) vertebrae of fish, most reptiles, some birds, some dinosaurs and some mammals with long tails. The vertebral processes can either give the structure rigidity, help them articulate with ribs, or serve as muscle attachment points. Common types are transverse process, diapophyses, parapophyses, and zygapophyses (both the cranial zygapophyses and the caudal zygapophyses). The centrum of the vertebra can be classified based on the fusion of its elements. In temnospondyls, bones such as the spinous process, the pleurocentrum and the intercentrum are separate ossifications. Fused elements, however, classify a vertebra as having holospondyly.

A vertebra can also be described in terms of the shape of the ends of the centrum. Centra with flat ends are acoelous, like those in mammals. These flat ends of the centra are especially good at supporting and distributing compressive forces. Amphicoelous vertebra have centra with both ends concave. This shape is common in fish, where most motion is limited. Amphicoelous centra often are integrated with a full notochord. Procoelous vertebrae are anteriorly concave and posteriorly convex. They are found in frogs and modern reptiles. Opisthocoelous vertebrae are the opposite, possessing anterior convexity and posterior concavity. They are found in salamanders, and in some non-avian dinosaurs. Heterocoelous vertebrae have saddle-shaped articular surfaces. This type of configuration is seen in turtles that retract their necks, and birds, because it permits extensive lateral and vertical flexion motion without stretching the nerve cord too extensively or wringing it about its long axis.

In horses, the Arabian (breed) can have one less vertebrae and pair of ribs. This anomaly disappears in foals that are the product of an Arabian and another breed of horse.

=== Regional vertebrae ===
Vertebrae are defined by their location in the vertebral column. Cervical vertebrae are those in the neck area. With the exception of the two sloth genera (Choloepus and Bradypus) and the manatee genus, (Trichechus), all mammals have seven cervical vertebrae. In other vertebrates, the number of cervical vertebrae can range from a single vertebra in amphibians to as many as 25 in swans or 76 in the extinct plesiosaur Elasmosaurus. The dorsal vertebrae range from the bottom of the neck to the top of the pelvis. Dorsal vertebrae attached to the ribs are called thoracic vertebrae, while those without ribs are called lumbar vertebrae. The sacral vertebrae are those in the pelvic region, and range from one in amphibians, to two in most birds and modern reptiles, or up to three to five in mammals. When multiple sacral vertebrae are fused into a single structure, it is called the sacrum. The synsacrum is a similar fused structure found in birds that is composed of the sacral, lumbar, and some of the thoracic and caudal vertebra, as well as the pelvic girdle. Caudal vertebrae compose the tail, and the final few can be fused into the pygostyle in birds, or into the coccygeal or tail bone in chimpanzees (and humans).

=== Fish and amphibians ===
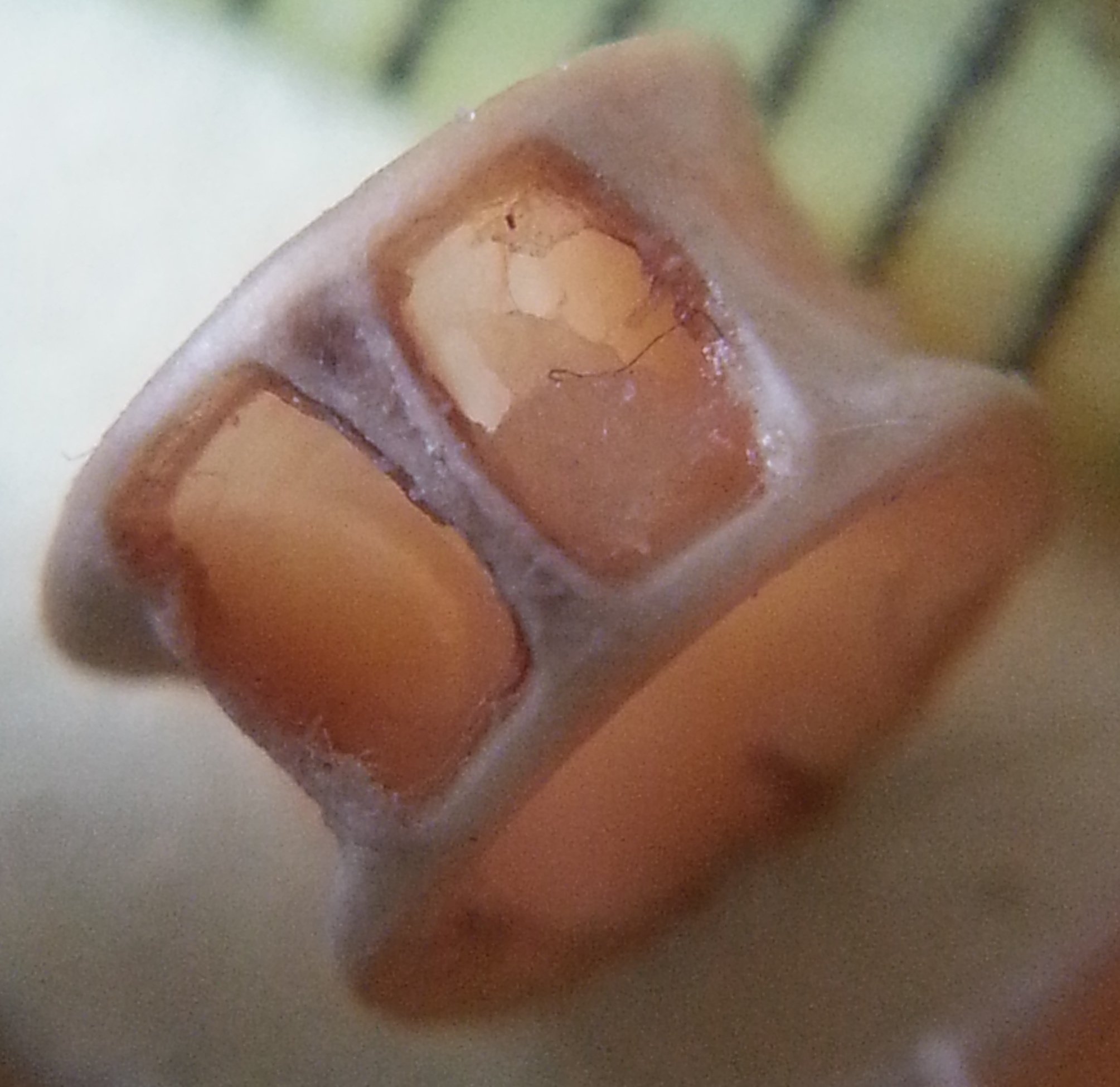
A vertebra (diameter 5 mm) of a small ray-finned fish

The vertebrae of lobe-finned fishes consist of three discrete bony elements. The vertebral arch surrounds the spinal cord, and is of broadly similar form to that found in most other vertebrates. Just beneath the arch lies a small plate-like pleurocentrum, which protects the upper surface of the notochord, and below that, a larger arch-shaped intercentrum to protect the lower border. Both of these structures are embedded within a single cylindrical mass of cartilage. A similar arrangement was found in the primitive Labyrinthodonts, but in the evolutionary line that led to reptiles (and hence, also to mammals and birds), the intercentrum became partially or wholly replaced by an enlarged pleurocentrum, which in turn became the bony vertebral body. In most ray-finned fishes, including all teleosts, these two structures are fused with, and embedded within, a solid piece of bone superficially resembling the vertebral body of mammals. In living amphibians, there is simply a cylindrical piece of bone below the vertebral arch, with no trace of the separate elements present in the early tetrapods.

In cartilaginous fish, such as sharks, the vertebrae consist of two cartilaginous tubes. The upper tube is formed from the vertebral arches, but also includes additional cartilaginous structures filling in the gaps between the vertebrae, and so enclosing the spinal cord in an essentially continuous sheath. The lower tube surrounds the notochord, and has a complex structure, often including multiple layers of calcification.

Lampreys have vertebral arches, but nothing resembling the vertebral bodies found in all higher vertebrates. Even the arches are discontinuous, consisting of separate pieces of arch-shaped cartilage around the spinal cord in most parts of the body, changing to long strips of cartilage above and below in the tail region. Hagfishes lack a true vertebral column, and are therefore not properly considered vertebrates, but a few tiny neural arches are present in the tail.

=== Other vertebrates ===
The general structure of human vertebrae is fairly typical of that found in other mammals, reptiles, and birds (amniotes). The shape of the vertebral body does, however, vary somewhat between different groups. In humans and other mammals, it typically has flat upper and lower surfaces, while in reptiles the anterior surface commonly has a concave socket into which the expanded convex face of the next vertebral body fits. Even these patterns are only generalisations, however, and there may be variation in form of the vertebrae along the length of the spine even within a single species. Some unusual variations include the saddle-shaped sockets between the cervical vertebrae of birds and the presence of a narrow hollow canal running down the centre of the vertebral bodies of geckos and tuataras, containing a remnant of the notochord.

Reptiles often retain the primitive intercentra, which are present as small crescent-shaped bony elements lying between the bodies of adjacent vertebrae; similar structures are often found in the caudal vertebrae of mammals. In the tail, these are attached to chevron-shaped bones called haemal arches, which attach below the base of the spine, and help to support the musculature. These latter bones are probably homologous with the ventral ribs of fish. The number of vertebrae in the spines of reptiles is highly variable, and may be several hundred in some species of snake.

In birds, there is a variable number of cervical vertebrae, which often form the only truly flexible part of the spine. The thoracic vertebrae are partially fused, providing a solid brace for the wings during flight. The sacral vertebrae are fused with the lumbar vertebrae, and some thoracic and caudal vertebrae, to form a single structure, the synsacrum, which is thus of greater relative length than the sacrum of mammals. In living birds, the remaining caudal vertebrae are fused into a further bone, the pygostyle, for attachment of the tail feathers.

Aside from the tail, the number of vertebrae in mammals is generally fairly constant. There are almost always seven cervical vertebrae (sloths and manatees are among the few exceptions), followed by around twenty or so further vertebrae, divided between the thoracic and lumbar forms, depending on the number of ribs. There are generally three to five vertebrae with the sacrum, and anything up to fifty caudal vertebrae.

=== Dinosaurs ===
The vertebral column in dinosaurs consists of the cervical (neck), dorsal (back), sacral (hips), and caudal (tail) vertebrae. Saurischian dinosaur vertebrae sometimes possess features known as pleurocoels, which are hollow depressions on the lateral portions of the vertebrae, perforated to create an entrance into the air chambers within the vertebrae, which served to decrease the weight of these bones without sacrificing strength. These pleurocoels were filled with air sacs, which would have further decreased weight. In sauropod dinosaurs, the largest known land vertebrates, pleurocoels and air sacs may have reduced the animal's weight by over a ton in some instances, a handy evolutionary adaption in animals that grew to over 30 metres in length. In many hadrosaur and theropod dinosaurs, the caudal vertebrae were reinforced by ossified tendons. The presence of three or more sacral vertebrae, in association with the hip bones, is one of the defining characteristics of dinosaurs. The occipital condyle is a structure on the posterior part of a dinosaur's skull that articulates with the first cervical vertebra.

=== Gallery ===
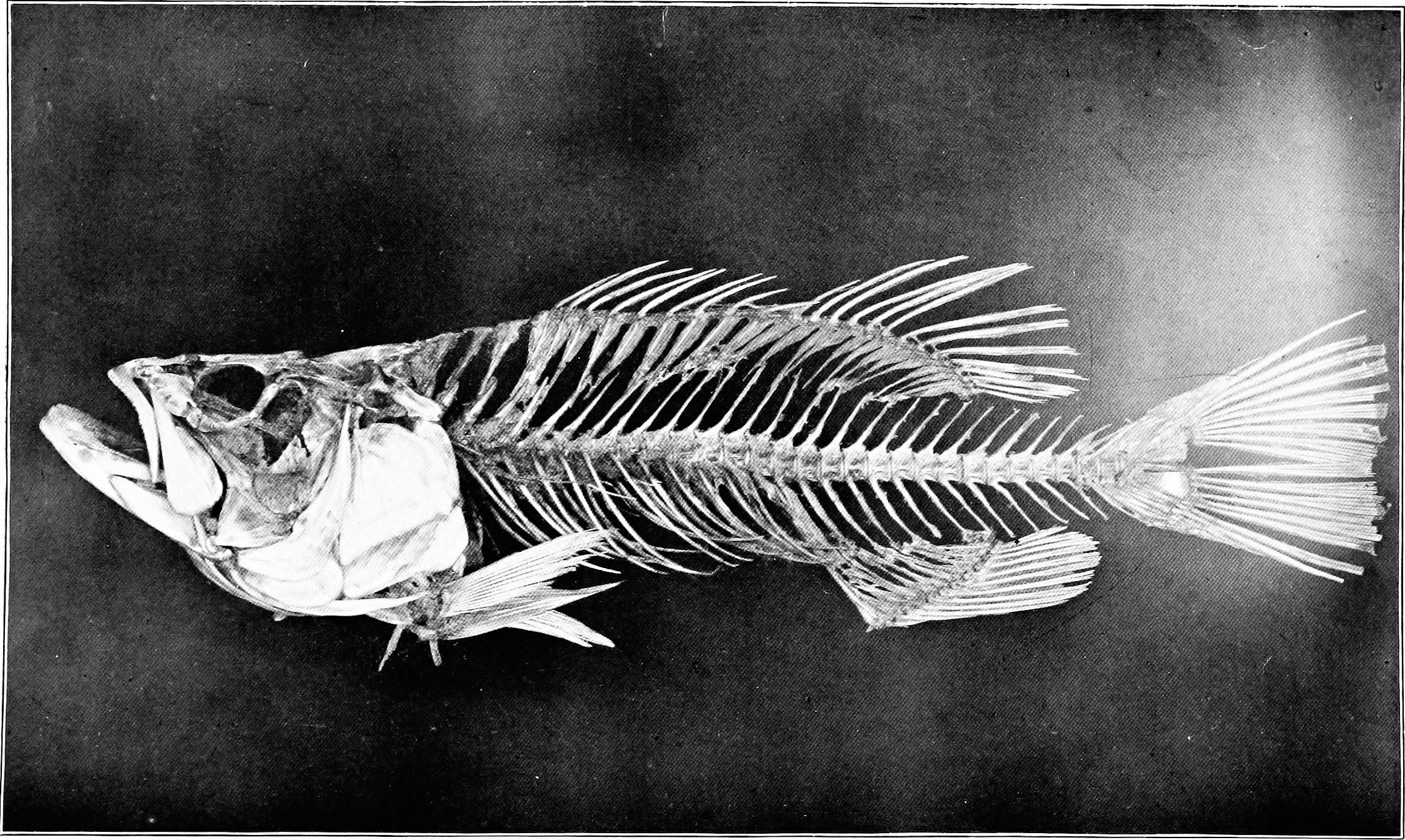
Bones of a black bass

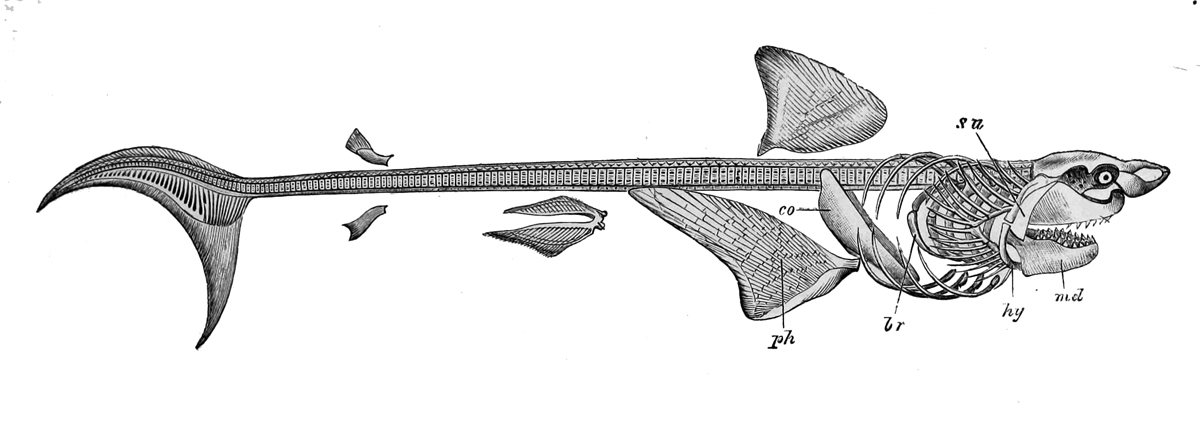
Drawing of a Great White shark skeleton. Sharks have no ribs.

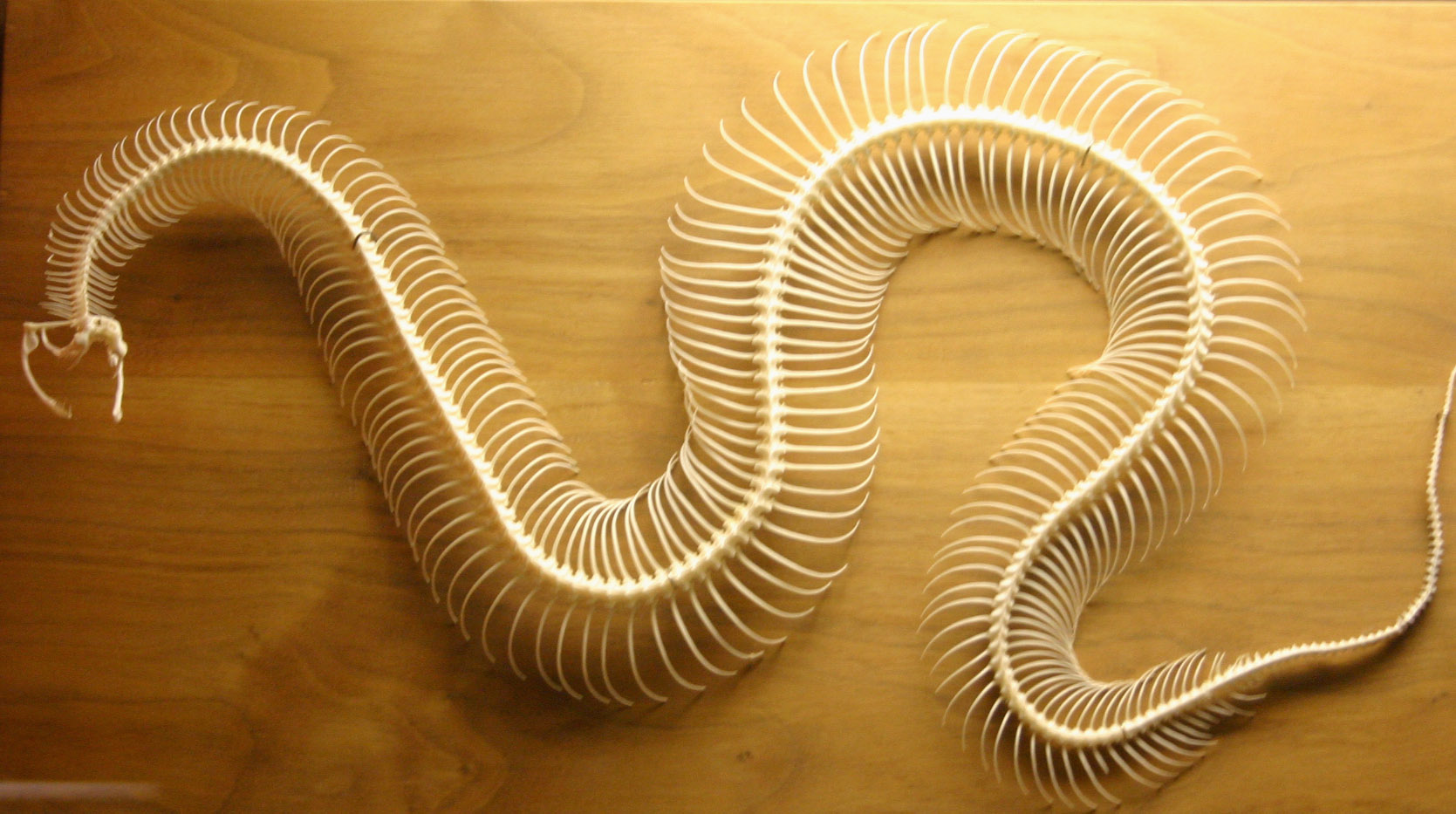
Snake skeleton. Snakes can have hundreds of thoracic vertebrae and ribs

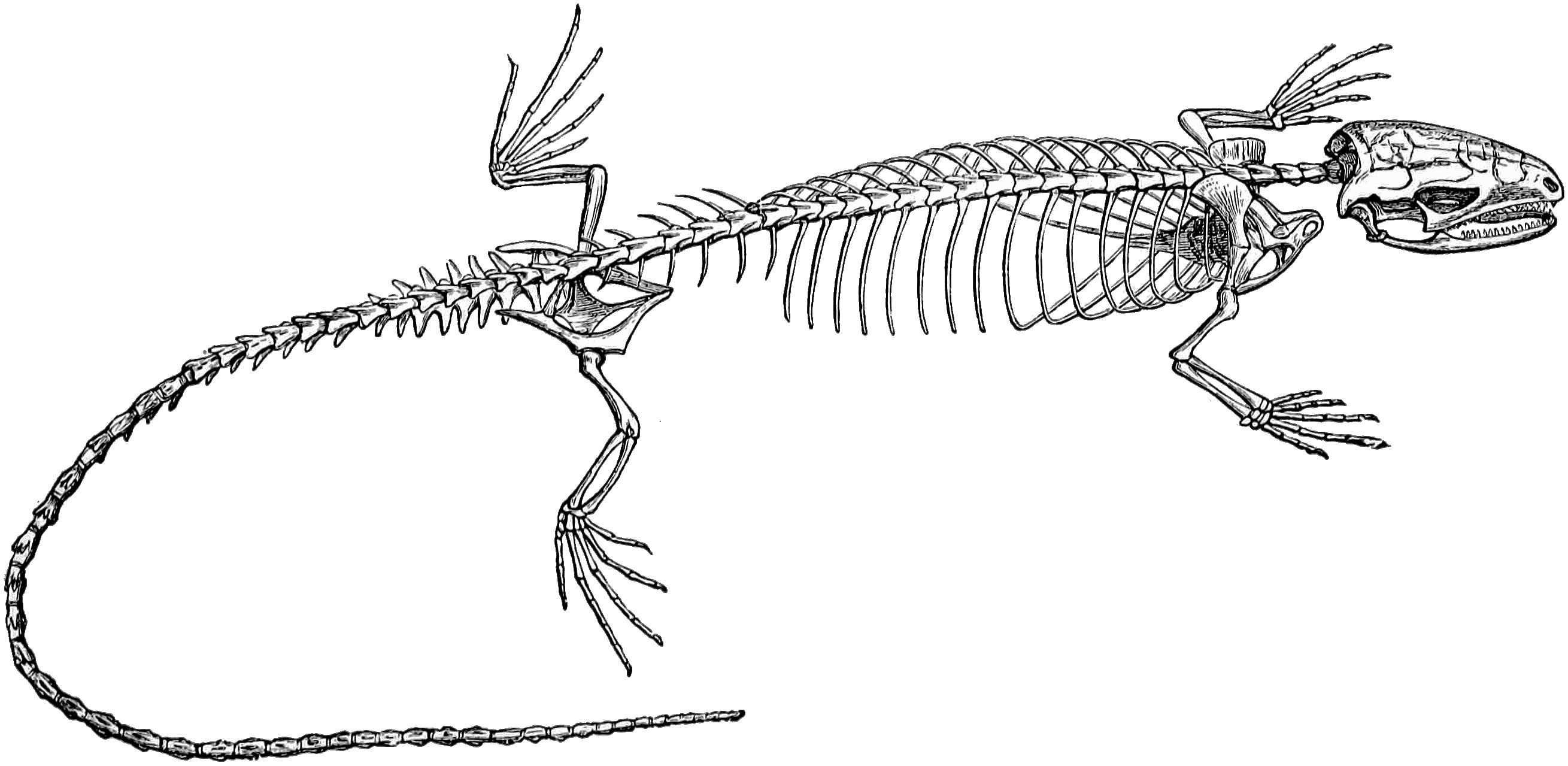
Lizard skeleton

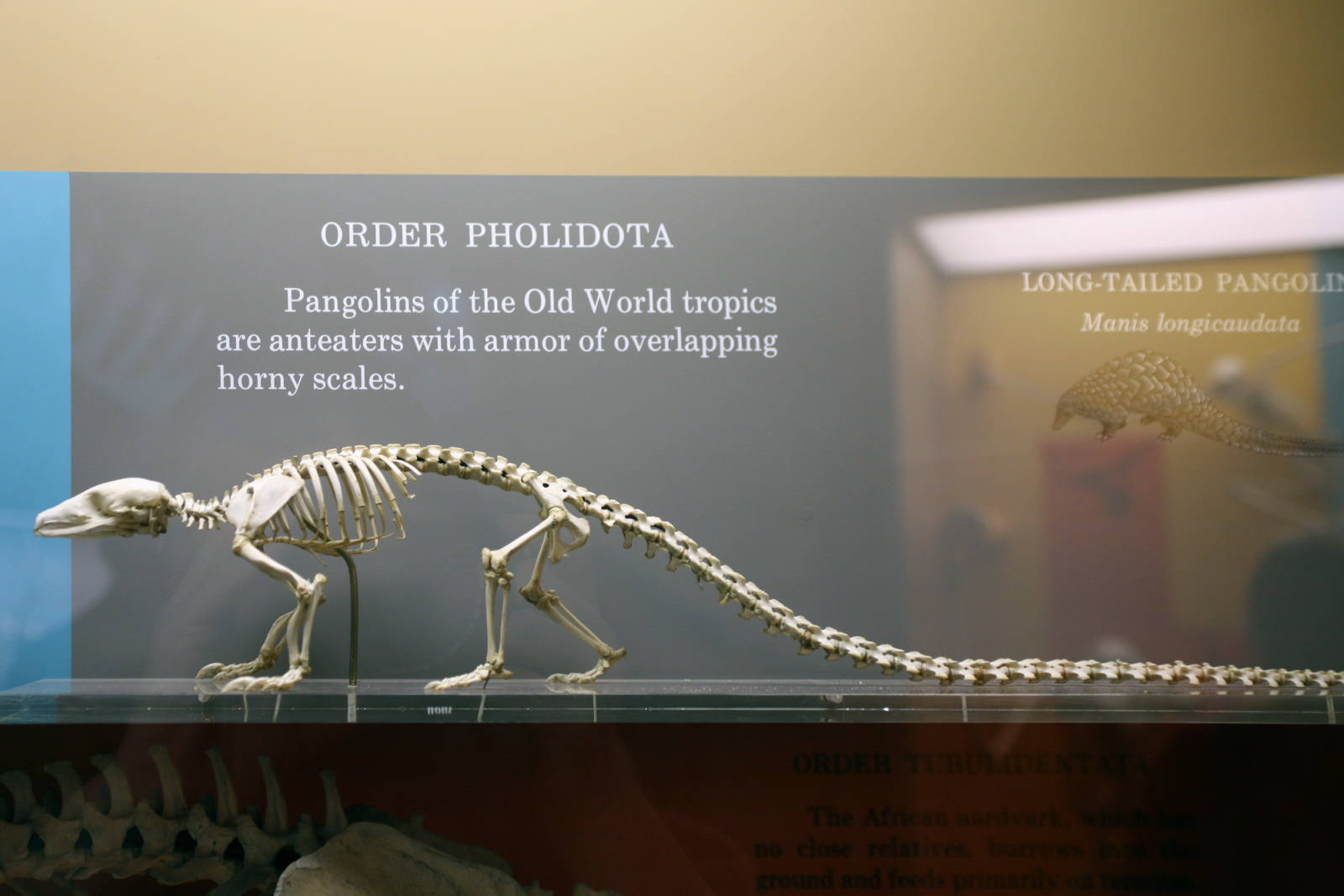
Long-tailed pangolin skeleton with 49 caudal vertebrae

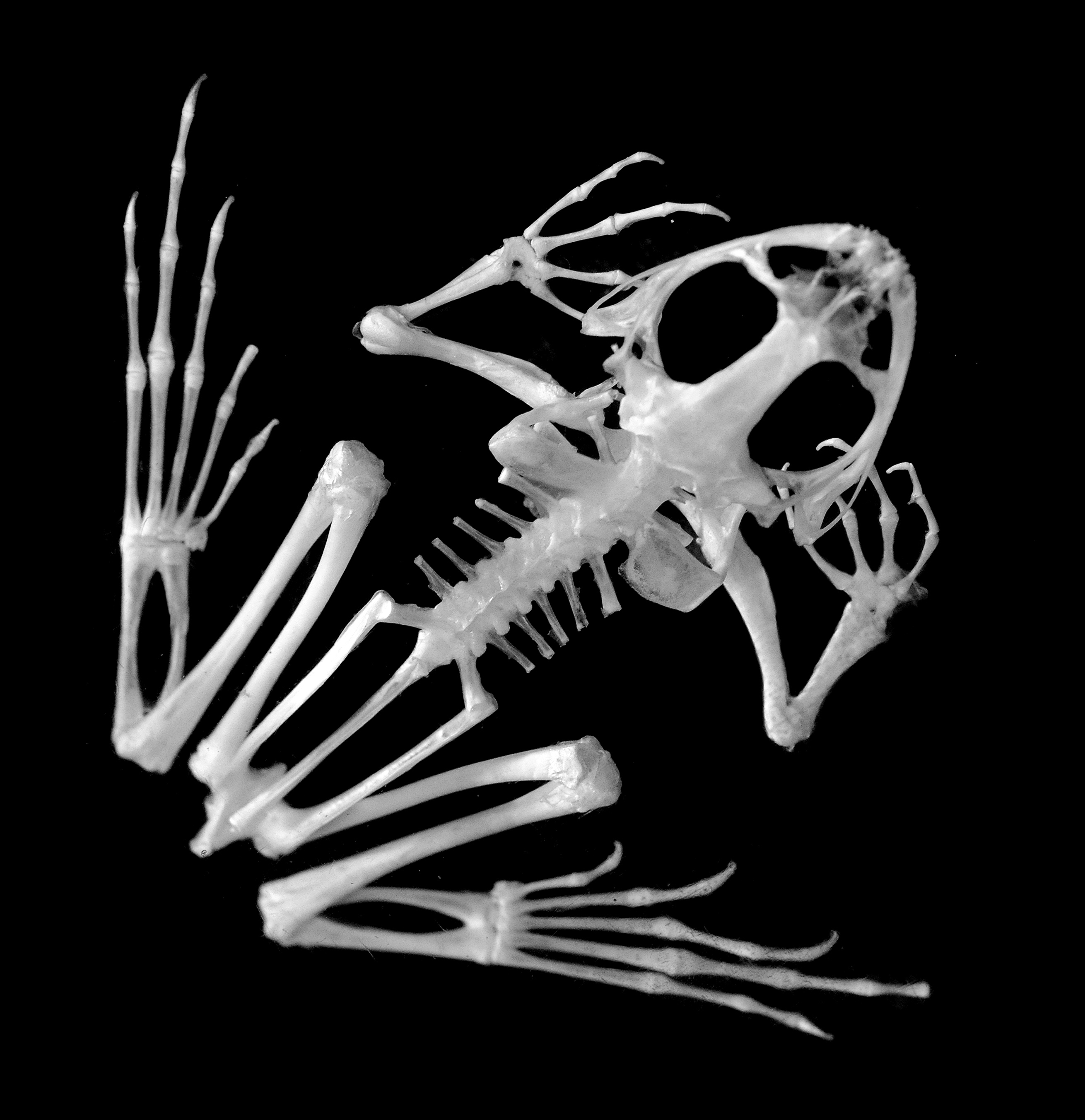
Frog skeleton

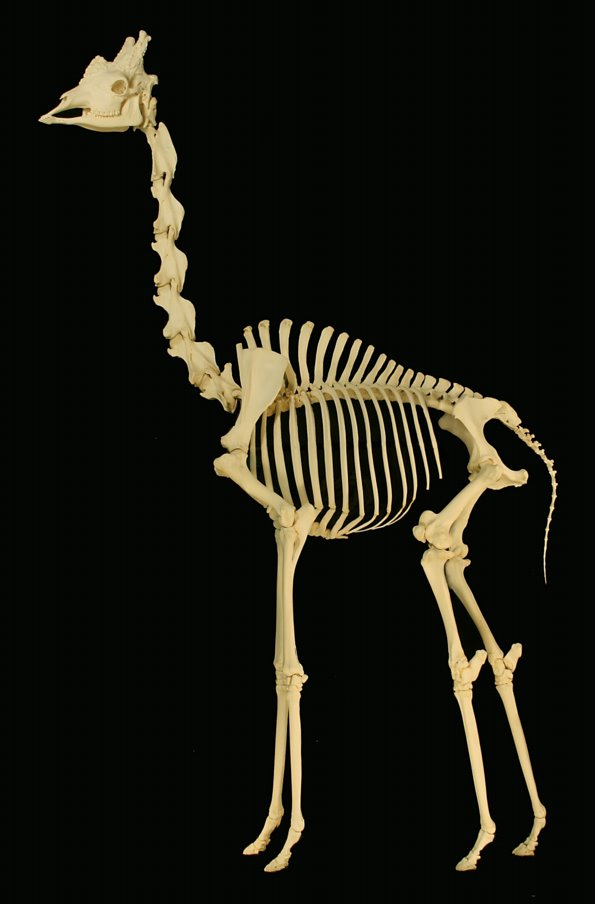
Giraffe skeleton showing the seven elongated cervical vertebrae

Horse skeleton with six lumbar vertebrae and 18 ribs

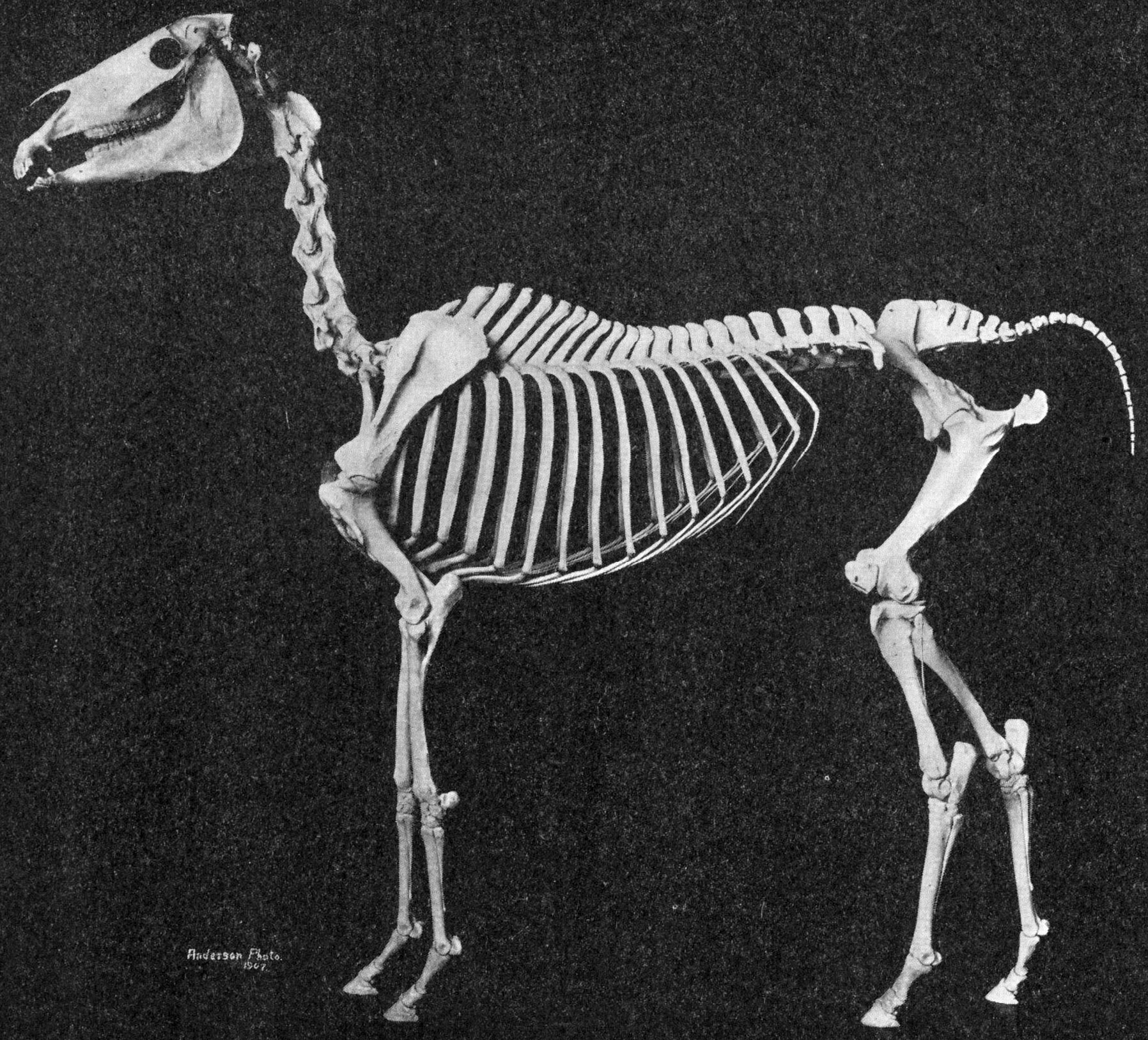
Arabian horse skeleton with five lumbar vertebrae and 17 ribs

Stylised dove skeleton. Birds have between 8 and 25 cervical vertebrae

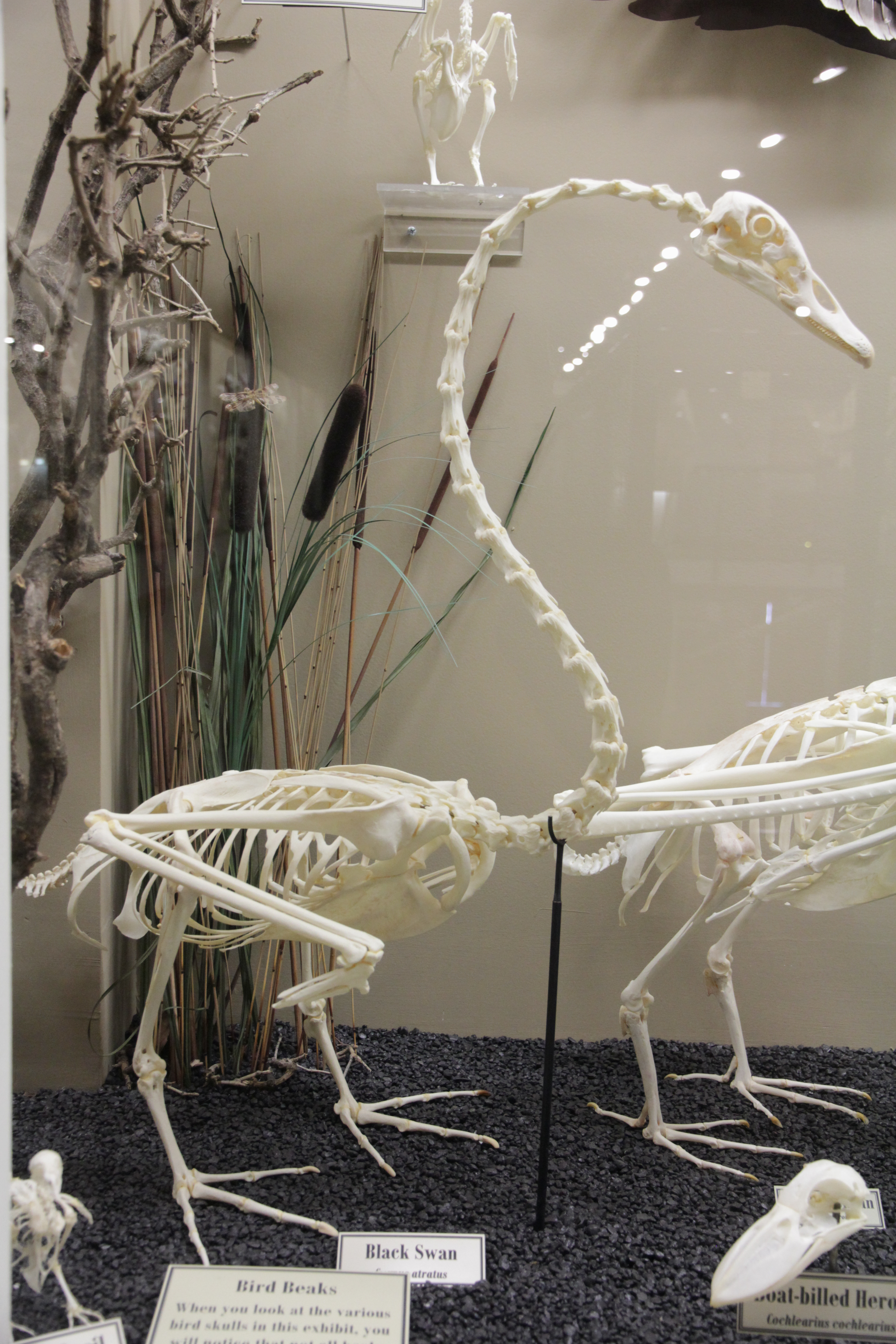
Black swan skeleton, swans have 25 cervical vertebrae

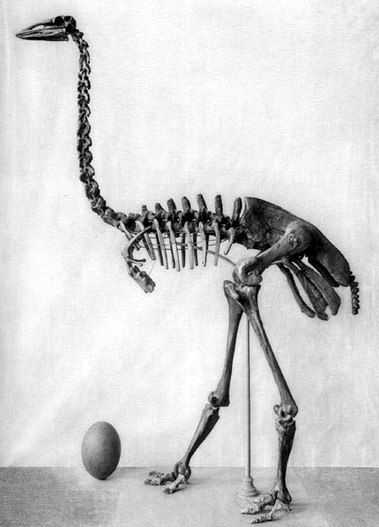
Skeleton of an extinct elephant bird, with 17 cervical vertebrae

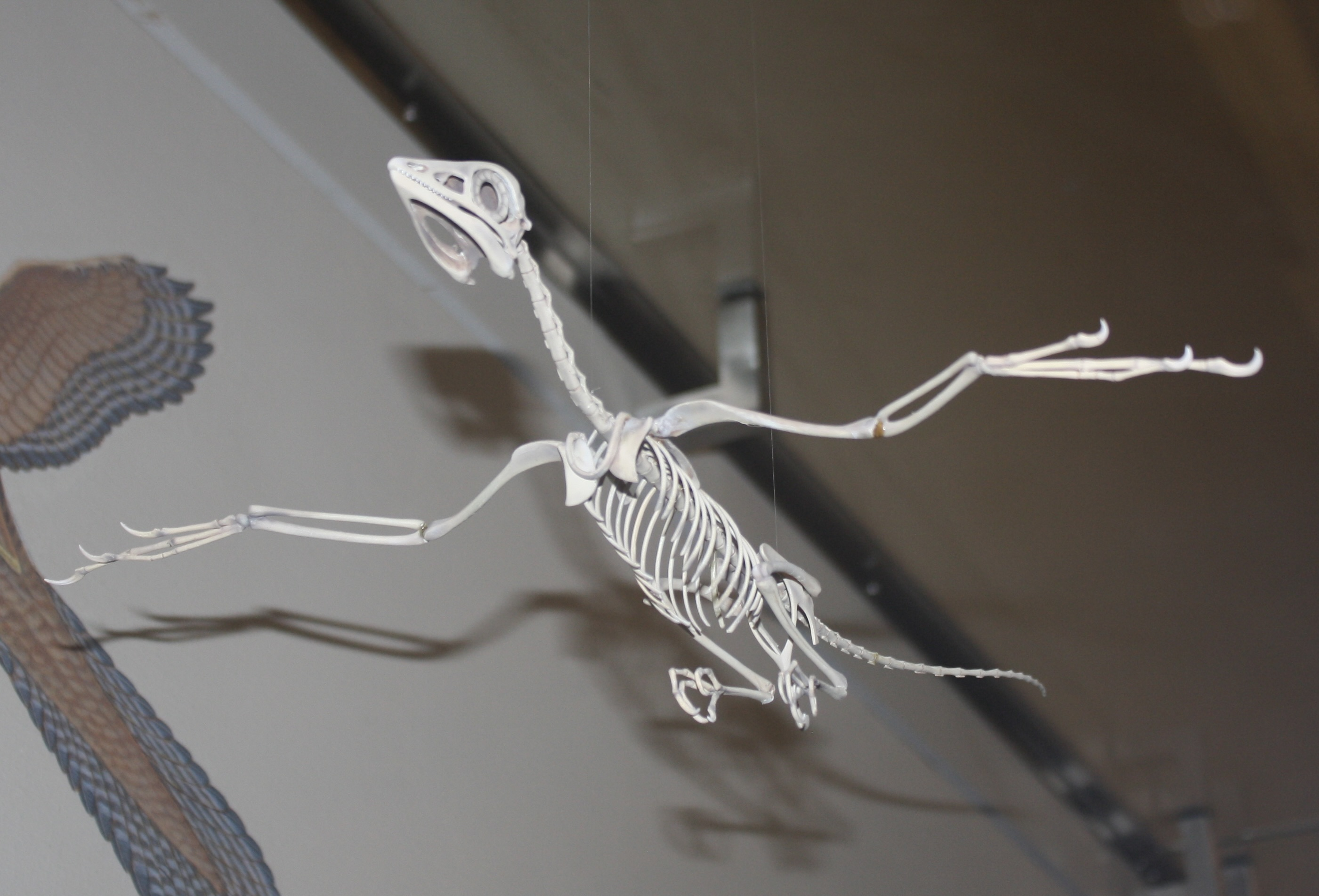
Skeletal reconstruction of Archaeopteryx

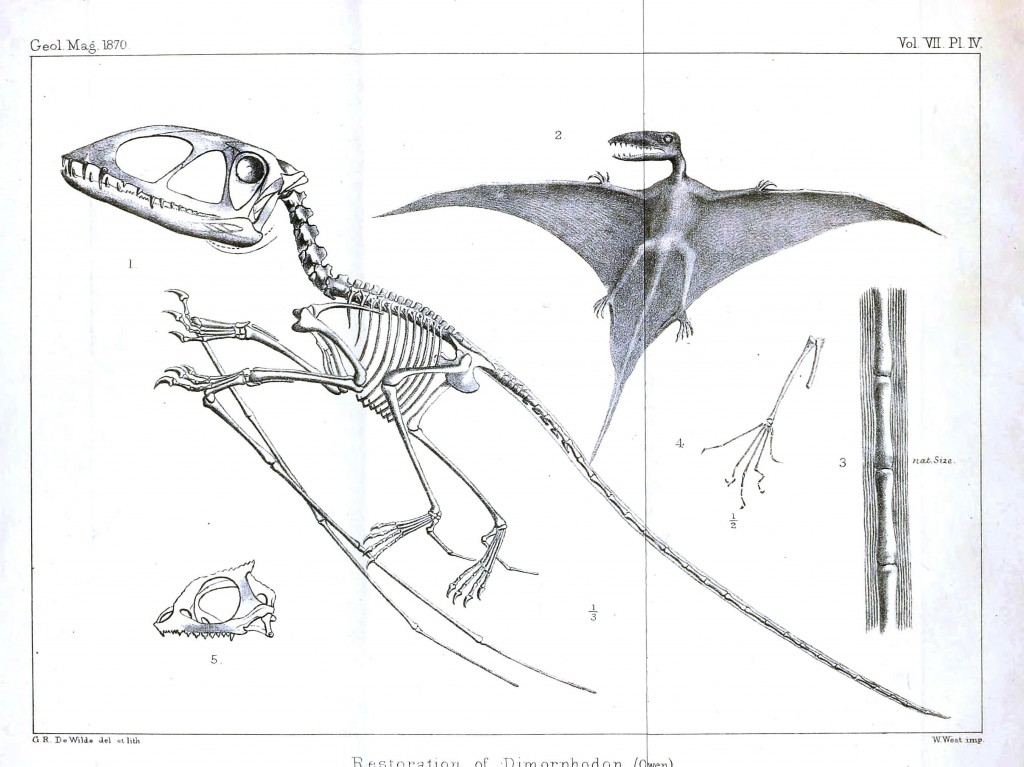
Drawing of a Pterodactyl skeleton (Dimorphodon macronyx)

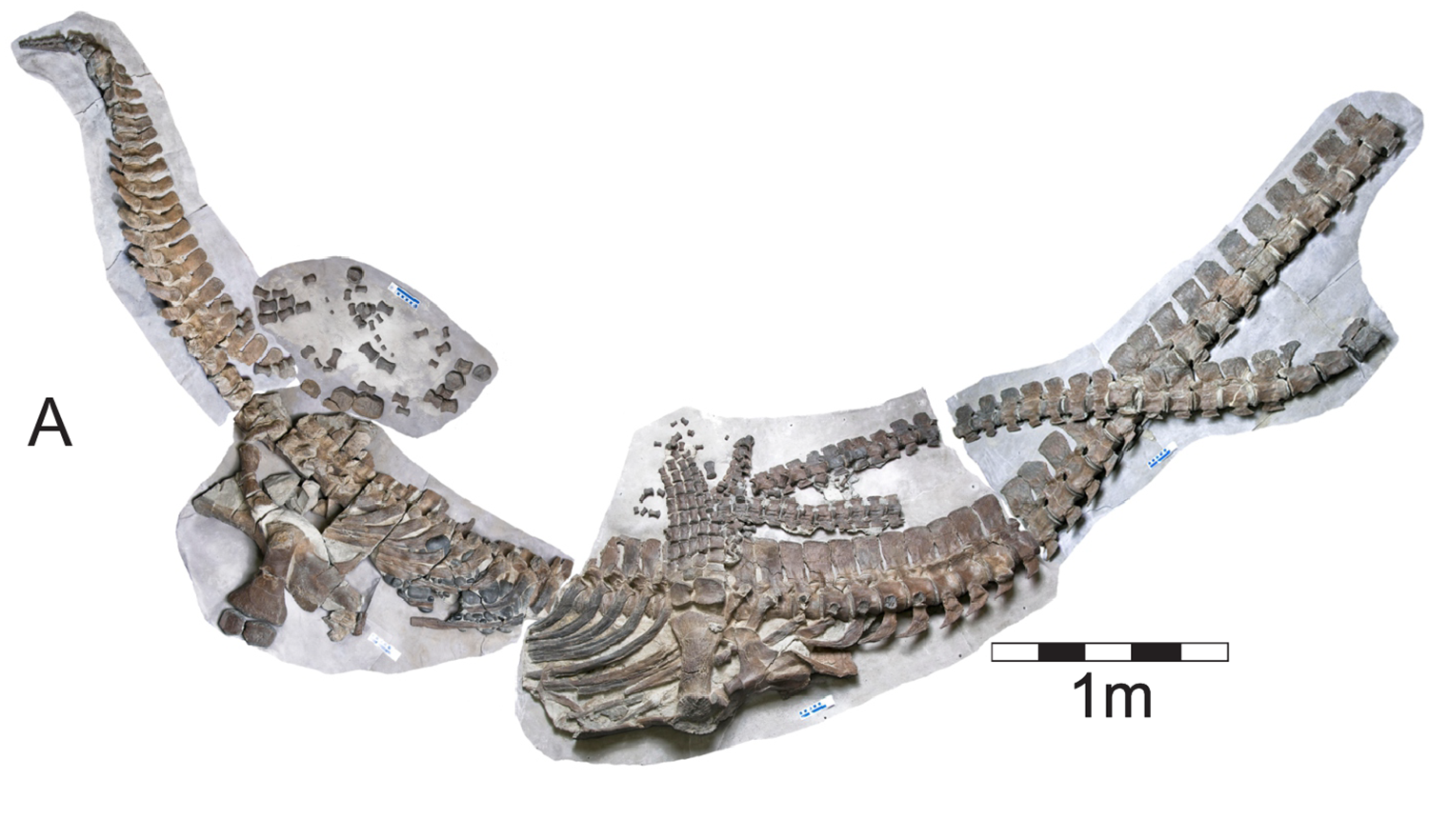
Albertonectes vanderveldei, a plesiosaur which had 132 vertebrae including 76 in the neck

== See also ==
- Low back pain
- Neuromechanics of idiopathic scoliosis
- Neutral spine
