= External vertebral venous plexuses =

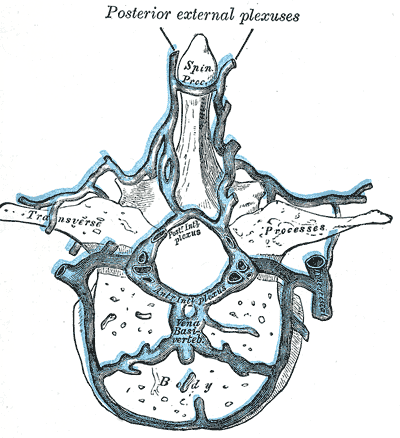
- Transverse section of a thoracic vertebra, showing the vertebral venous plexuses.

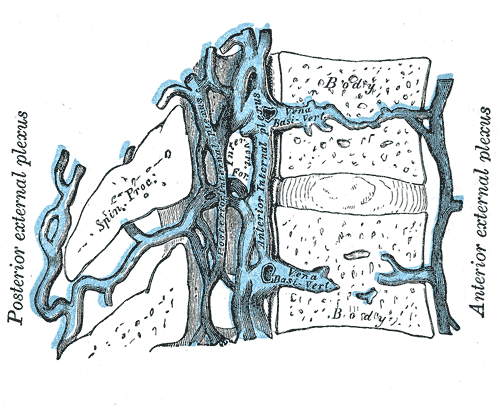
- Median sagittal section of two thoracic vertebrae, showing the vertebral venous plexuses.

Details

Identifiers
- Latin: plexus venosi vertebrales externi
- TA2: 4950
- FMA: 12851

The external vertebral venous plexuses (extraspinal veins) consist of anterior and posterior plexuses which anastomose freely with each other. They are most prominent in the cervical region where they form anastomoses with the vertebral, occipital, and deep cervical veins.

== Anterior and posterior ==
The anterior external vertebral venous plexuses are situated anteriorly to the vertebral bodies. They communicate with the basivertebral and intervertebral veins, and receive tributaries from the vertebral bodies.

The posterior external vertebral venous plexuses are situated posterior to the vertebral laminae, around and the spinous, transverse, and articular processes. They form anastomoses with the internal vertebral venous plexuses, and drain to vertebral veins, posterior intercostal veins, and lumbar veins.
