= Basivertebral veins =

Veins within the vertebral column

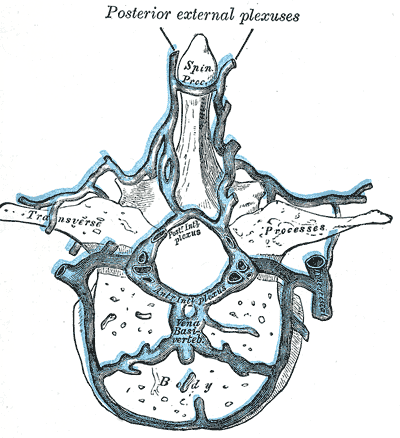
- Transverse section of a thoracic vertebra, showing the vertebral venous plexuses (basivertebral veins labeled as Vena Basi-verteb at bottom center)

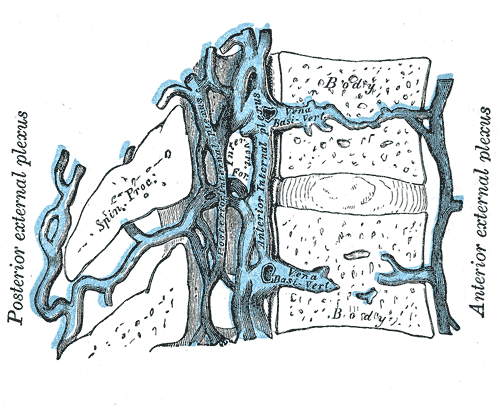
- Median sagittal section of two thoracic vertebrae, showing the vertebral venous plexuses (basivertebral veins labeled as Vena Basi-Vert at bottom right)

Details

Identifiers
- Latin: venae basivertebrales
- TA98: A12.3.07.022
- TA2: 4948
- FMA: 70891

The basivertebral veins are large, tortuous veins of the trabecular bone of vertebral bodies that drain into the internal and external vertebral venous plexuses.

They emerge from the vertebral bodies horizontally through foramina in the bone. Anteriorly, they drain into the external vertebral venous plexuses; posteriorly, they drain into the anterior internal vertebral venous plexus by way of transverse vessels that bridge the two vertical anterior internal vertebral plexus vessels across the midline.

== Anatomy ==
They are contained in large, tortuous channels in the bony substance of the vertebral bodies akin to those in the diploë of the cranial bones. Anteriorly and laterally, they emerge through small foramina upon the vertebral bodies to drain into the external vertebral plexus, whereas posteriorly, they converge into a single canal (which is sometimes doubled distally) before emptying into the internal vertebral plexus. The posterior longitudinal ligament is narrower and less firmly attached to vertebral bodies (compared to over the intervertebral discs) so as to allow for passage of the basivertebral veins.

The basivertebral veins are the main tributaries of the internal vertebral venous plexus.

=== Development ===
The basivertebral veins become enlarged in advanced age.

== Clinical significance ==
It is unclear whether basivertebral veins contain functional venous valves; blood flow through basivertebral veins may be reversible, suggesting a possible mechanism for metastatic spread of e.g. prostatic cancer to the spine during temporary blood flow reversals (e.g. during periods of elevated intra-abdominal pressure or during postural alterations).
