= Ligamenta flava =

Ligaments connecting the laminae of adjacent vertebrae

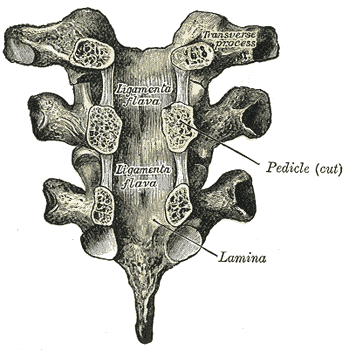
- Vertebral arches of three thoracic vertebrae viewed from the front

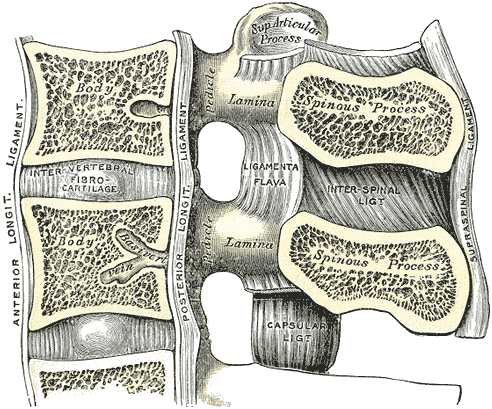
- Median sagittal section of two lumbar vertebrae and their ligaments

Details
- System: Skeletal
- From: Laminae of adjacent vertebrae

Identifiers
- Latin: ligamenta flava (singular: ligamentum flavum)
- MeSH: D017843
- TA98: A03.2.01.003
- TA2: 1675
- FMA: 76816

The ligamenta flava (sg.: ligamentum flavum, Latin for yellow ligament) are a series of ligaments that connect the ventral parts of the laminae of adjacent vertebrae. They help to preserve upright posture, preventing hyperflexion, and ensuring that the vertebral column straightens after flexion. Hypertrophy can cause spinal stenosis.

They appear yellowish in colour due to their high elastic fibre content.

== Anatomy ==
Each ligamentum flavum connects the laminae of two adjacent vertebrae. They attach to the anterior portion of the upper lamina above, and the posterior portion of the lower lamina below. They begin with the junction of the axis and third cervical vertebra, continuing down to the junction of the 5th lumbar vertebra and the sacrum.

In the neck region the ligaments are thin, but broad and long; they are thicker in the thoracic region, and thickest in the lumbar region. They are thinnest between the atlas bone (C1) and the axis bone (C2), and may be absent in some people. They become longer inferiorly in the cervical spine, as the distance between adjacent laminae increases.

They are best seen from the interior of the vertebral canal. When looked at from the outer surface they appear short, being overlapped by the lamina of the vertebral arch.

=== Structure ===
Each ligament consists of two lateral portions which commence one on either side of the roots of the articular processes, and extend backward to the point where the laminae meet to form the spinous process; the posterior margins of the two portions are in contact and to a certain extent united, slight intervals being left for the passage of small vessels. Small veins that form anastomotic connections between the internal and external vertebral venous plexuses may pass between a pair of the ligaments.

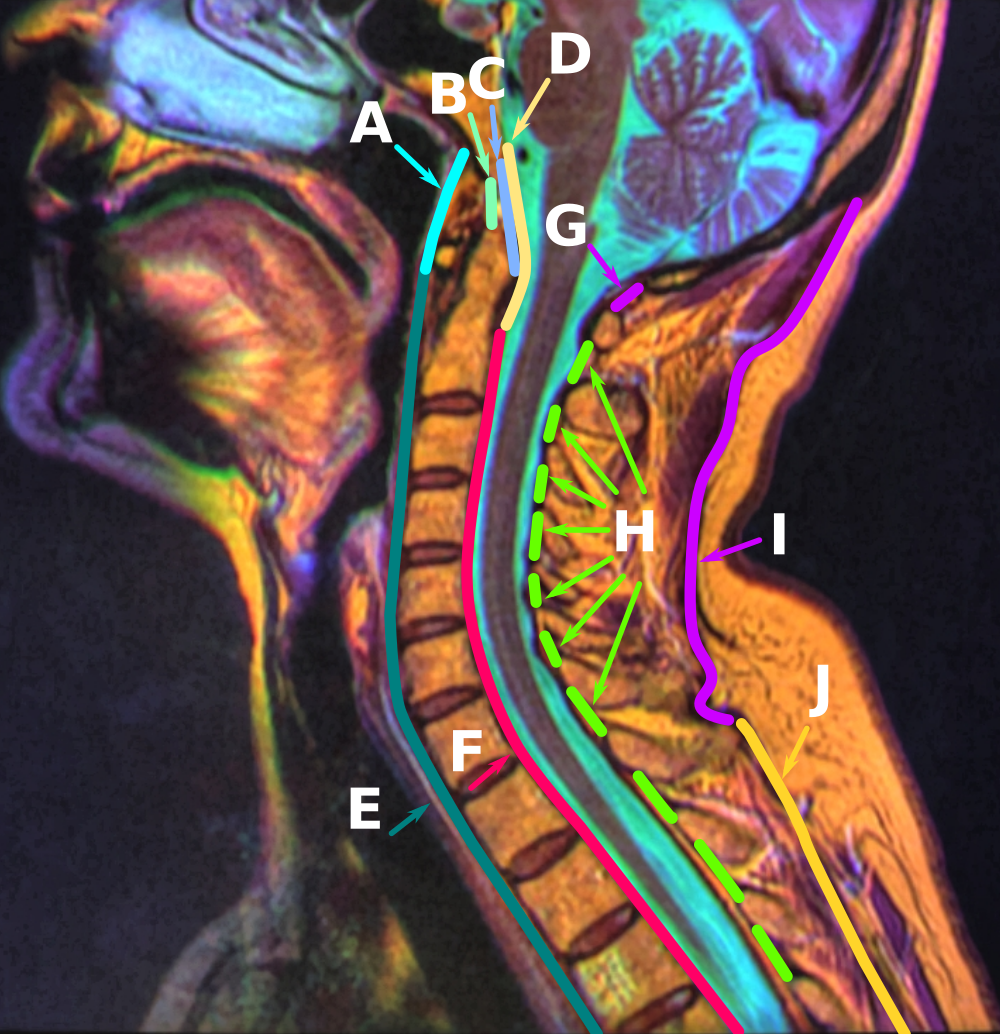
H: Ligamenta flava

Ligamenta flava undergo slight fibrotic and chondrometaplastic changes with aging. In spinal stenosis, the density of the ligaments is reduced possibly causing a bulge into the spinal canal in the standing position.

== Function ==
The ligamenta flava become stretched with flexion of the spine. The marked elasticity of the ligamenta flava serves to preserve upright posture, and to assist the vertebral column in resuming it after flexion. The elastin, fairly unique to the ligamenta flava among other ligaments, prevents buckling of the ligament into the spinal canal during extension, which would cause spinal cord compression.

== Clinical significance ==
Because these ligaments lie in the posterior part of the vertebral canal, their hypertrophy can cause spinal stenosis, particularly in patients with diffuse idiopathic skeletal hyperostosis. The ligamenta flava may also become fatty or calcify during ageing. These cause degeneration of elastin. Some studies indicate that the hypertrophy of these ligaments may be linked to a fibrotic process associated with increased collagen VI, which could represent an adaptive and reparative process in response to the rupture of elastic fibers.

=== Epidural ===
During an epidural, the needle has to be inserted into the spinal space through a ligamentum flavum. Once it passes through, this is felt as a decrease in the pressure requited to further advance the needle. This makes the ligamentum flavum an important landmark to overcome to ensure proper needle placement.

=== Removal ===
During a microdiscectomy, a procedure to remove part of an intervertebral disc that is pressing on the spinal nerves, the ligamenta flava may need to be removed or reshaped. A hook can be placed underneath a ligamentum flavum to ensure it is separated from the dura mater.
