= Intervertebral veins =

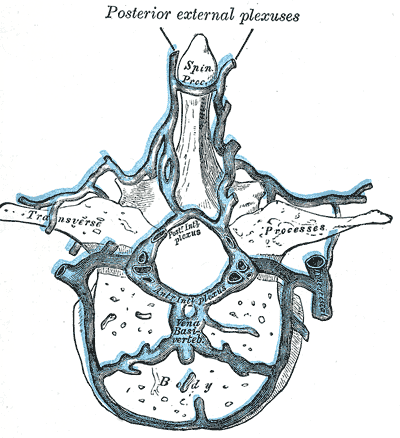
- Transverse section of a thoracic vertebra, showing the vertebral venous plexuses.

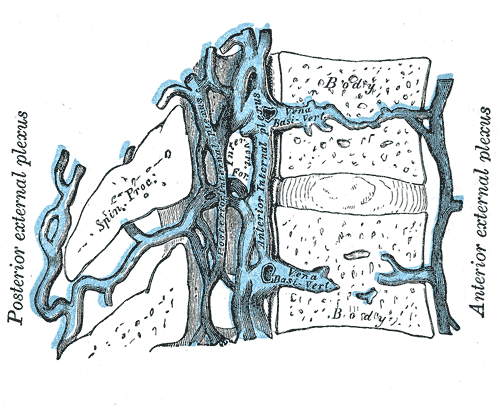
- Median sagittal section of two thoracic vertebrae, showing the vertebral venous plexuses.

Details

Identifiers
- Latin: vena intervertebralis

The intervertebral veins accompany the spinal nerves through the intervertebral foramina to drain the internal vertebral venous plexuses into the external vertebral venous plexuses. They drain (in craniocaudal sequence) into vertebral vein, intercostal veins, lumbar veins, and lateral sacral veins. Upper posterior intercostal veins may additionally drain via brachiocephalic vens. They may drain to ascending lumbar veins. They may drain into the inferior vena cava directly, reaching it by winding around the surface of the vertebral body.

It is unclear whether intervertebral veins contain functional venous valves; blood flow through intervertebral veins may be reversible, suggesting a possible mechanism for metastatic spread of e.g. prostatic cancer to the spine during temporary blood flow reversals (e.g. during periods of elevated intra-abdominal pressure or during postural alterations).

== Anatomy ==
=== Fate ===
Their drainage depends upon the part of the body:

- Cervical region: vertebral vein
- Thoracic region: intercostal veins
- Lumbar region: lumbar veins
- Sacral region: lateral sacral veins
