= Supraspinous ligament =

Ligament of the spine

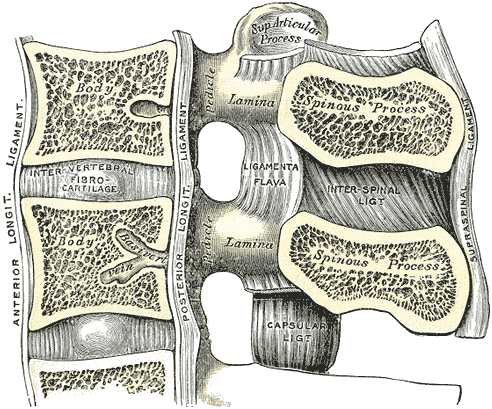
- Median sagittal section of two lumbar vertebræ and their ligaments.

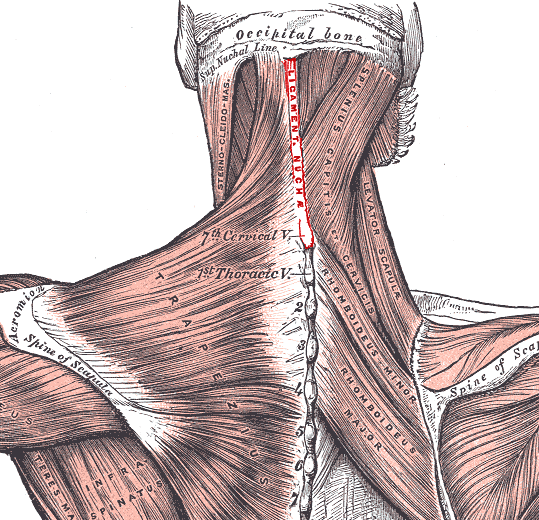
- Posterior view of muscles connecting the upper extremity to the vertebral column. Nuchal ligament labeled in red at center.

Details
- From: Spinous process of C7
- To: Sacrum

Identifiers
- Latin: ligamentum supraspinale
- TA98: A03.2.01.005
- TA2: 1677
- FMA: 13425

The supraspinous ligament (also known as the supraspinal ligament) is a ligament extending across the tips of the spinous processes of the vertebra of the vertebral column.

== Anatomy ==
The supraspinous ligament connects the tips of the spinous processes from the seventh cervical vertebra to the sacrum. Superior to the 7th cervical vertebra, the supraspinous ligament is continuous with the nuchal ligament. It is thicker and broader in the lumbar region than in the thoracic region, and intimately blended with the neighboring fascia in both these regions. Inferior to L4, the supraspinous ligament becomes indistinct, lost amid the prominent lumbar fascia.

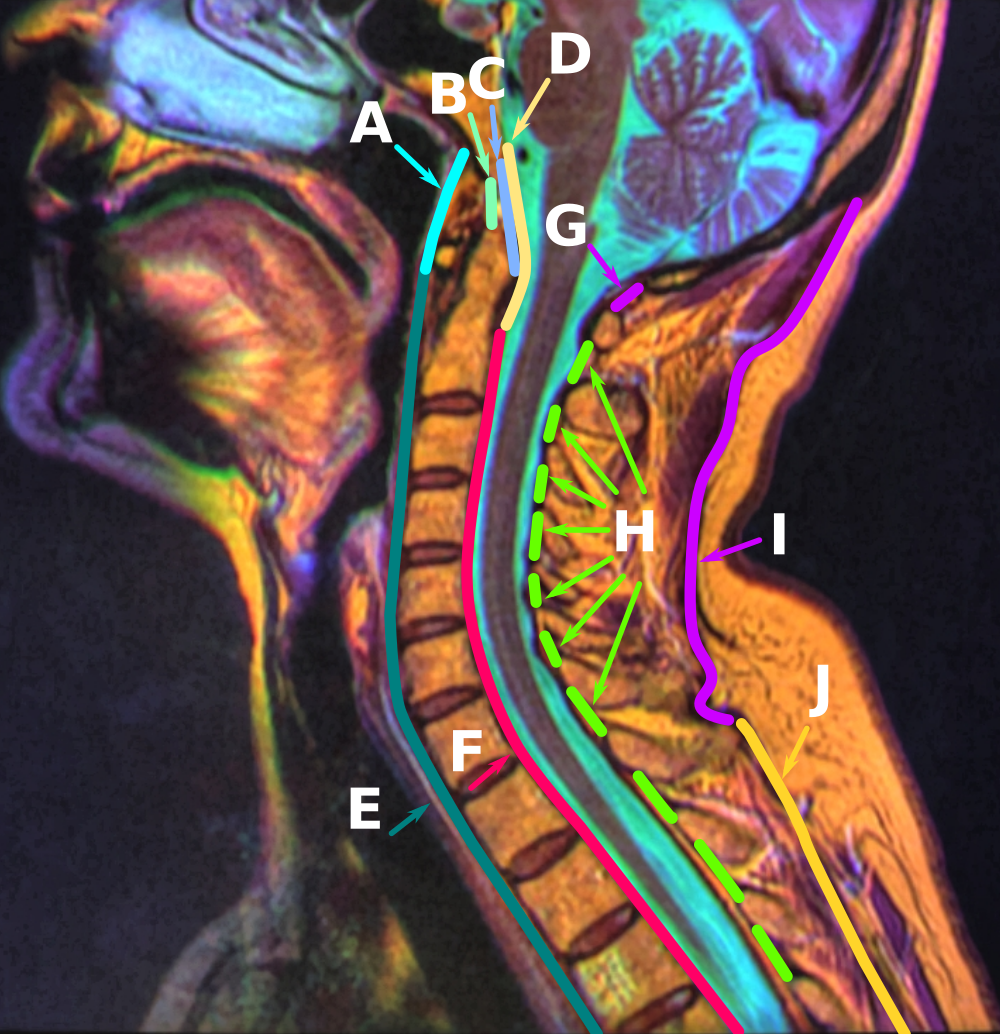
J: Supraspinous ligament

Between the spinous processes, the supraspinous ligament is continuous with the interspinous ligaments.

=== Structure ===
The most superficial fibers of this ligament extend across 3-4 vertebrae, deeper fibres extend across 2-3 vertebrae, while the deepest connect the spinous processes of adjacent vertebrae.

== Function ==
The supraspinous ligament becomes taut when the spine is fully flexed. The supraspinous ligament, along with the posterior longitudinal ligament, interspinous ligaments and ligamentum flavum, help to limit hyperflexion of the vertebral column.

== Clinical significance ==
Lesions to the supraspinous ligament may result in palpable thickening. Ultrasound is effective for detecting lesions. A strain injury can also damage the supraspinous ligament.

The supraspinous ligament creates resistance during midline epidural anaesthetics when the needle is being inserted. This increased resistance needs to be taken into account, and is one of the first subcutaneous tissues.
