= Posterior longitudinal ligament =

Ligament connecting vertebral bodies of all of the vertebrae

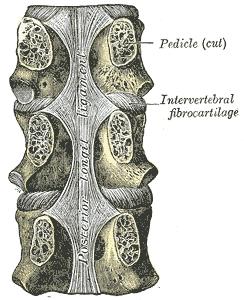
- Posterior longitudinal ligament, in the thoracic region. (Posterior longitudinal ligament runs vertically at center.)

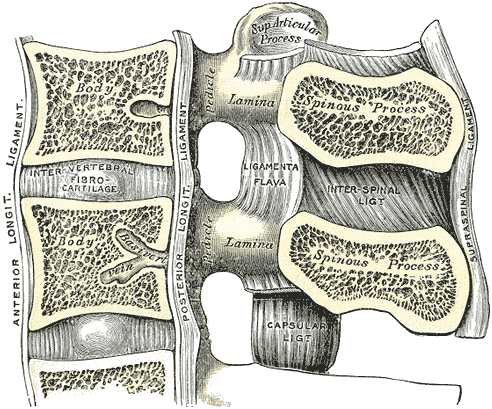
- Median sagittal section of two lumbar vertebrae and their ligaments. (Posterior longitudinal ligament runs vertically at center left.)

Details
- System: skeletal

Identifiers
- Latin: ligamentum longitudinale posterius
- TA98: A03.2.01.008
- TA2: 1680
- FMA: 31894

The posterior longitudinal ligament is a ligament connecting the posterior surfaces of the vertebral bodies of all of the vertebrae of humans. It weakly prevents hyperflexion of the vertebral column. It also prevents posterior spinal disc herniation, although problems with the ligament can cause it.

== Anatomy ==
The posterior longitudinal ligament is situated within the vertebral canal. It extends across the posterior surfaces of the bodies of the vertebrae. It extends superoinferiorly between the body of the axis superiorly, and (sources differ) the sacrum and possibly the coccyx or upper sacral canal inferiorly. It is continuous with the tectorial membrane of atlanto-axial joint superiorly, and with the deep dorsal sacrococcygeal ligament inferiorly.

The ligament gradually grows narrower inferiorly. The ligament is thicker in the thoracic than in the cervical and lumbar regions. In the thoracic and lumbar regions, it presents a series of dentations with intervening concave margins.

The posterior longitudinal ligament is generally quite wide and thin, and has serrated edges. It is narrow at the vertebral bodies (where it is firmly attached and where it covers the basivertebral veins), and broader over the intervertebral discs (to which it attaches less firmly to allow for the passage of the basivertebral veins).

=== Structure ===
This ligament is composed of smooth, shining, longitudinal fibers - denser and more compact than those of the anterior longitudinal ligament - and consists of superficial layers occupying the interval between three or four vertebræ, and deeper layers which extend between adjacent vertebrae. Deep fibres run between each vertebral body. Superficial fibres run between multiple vertebrae.

== Function ==
The posterior longitudinal ligament weakly prevents hyperflexion of the vertebral column. It also limits spinal disc herniation, although it is much narrower than the anterior longitudinal ligament.

== Clinical significance ==
The posterior longitudinal ligament is much narrower than the anterior longitudinal ligament. Because of this, spinal disc herniations usually occur in a posterolateral direction.

The posterior longitudinal ligament contains a higher density of nociceptors than many ligaments, so can cause back pain. It may ossify, particularly around cervical vertebrae.

The posterior longitudinal ligament has a high density of vasomotor fibres, allowing for increased blood flow to respond to damage to the ligament.

== See also ==
- Anterior longitudinal ligament
- Intervertebral disc

== Additional images ==
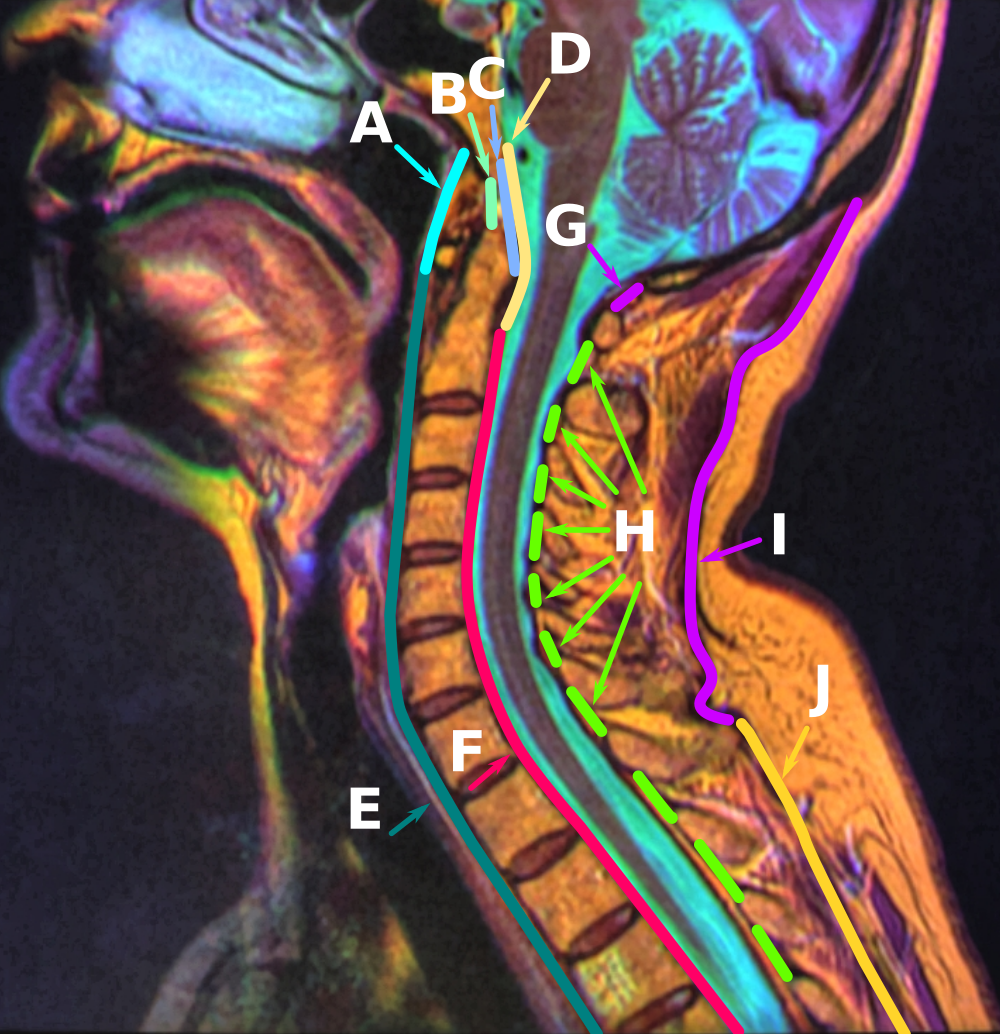
F: Posterior longitudinal ligament

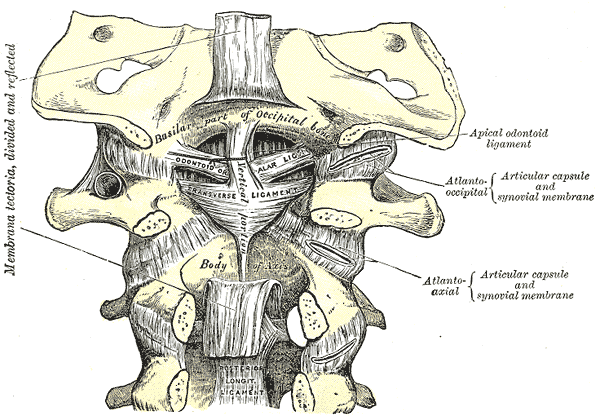
Membrana tectoria, transverse, and alar ligaments.
