= Spinal canal =

Passage through the vertebral column containing the spinal cord

- Spinal cavity shown as part of dorsal body cavity.

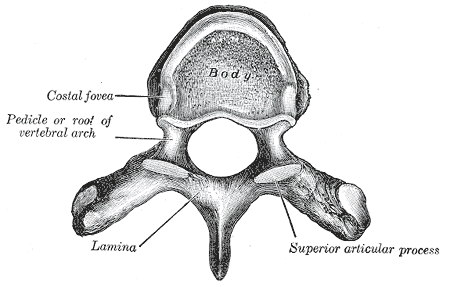
- A typical thoracic vertebra viewed from above. (Spinal canal is not labeled, but the foramen in the center would make up part of it.)

Details

Identifiers
- Latin: Canalis vertebralis
- MeSH: D013115
- TA98: A02.2.00.009
- TA2: 1009
- FMA: 9680

In human anatomy, the spinal canal, vertebral canal or spinal cavity is an elongated body cavity enclosed within the dorsal bony arches of the vertebral column, which contains the spinal cord, spinal roots and dorsal root ganglia. It is a process of the dorsal body cavity formed by alignment of the vertebral foramina. Under the vertebral arches, the spinal canal is also covered anteriorly by the posterior longitudinal ligament and posteriorly by the ligamentum flavum. The potential space between these ligaments and the dura mater covering the spinal cord is known as the epidural space. Spinal nerves exit the spinal canal via the intervertebral foramina under the corresponding vertebral pedicles.

In humans, the spinal cord gets outgrown by the vertebral column during development into adulthood, and the lower section of the spinal canal is occupied by the filum terminale and a bundle of spinal nerves known as the cauda equina instead of the actual spinal cord, which finishes at the L1/L2 level.

== Structure ==
The vertebral canal is enclosed anteriorly by the vertebral bodies, intervertebral discs, and the posterior longitudinal ligament; it is enclosed posteriorly by the vertebral laminae and the ligamenta flava; laterally, it is incompletely enclosed by the pedicles with the interval between two adjacent pedicles on either side creating an intervertebral foramen (allowing the passage of the spinal nerves and radicular blood vessels).

The vertebral canal progressively narrows inferiorly. It is wider in the cervical region to accommodate the cervical enlargement of the spinal cord.

=== Contents ===
The outermost layer of the meninges, the dura mater, is closely associated with the arachnoid mater which in turn is loosely connected to the innermost layer, the pia mater. The meninges divide the spinal canal into the epidural space and the subarachnoid space. The pia mater is closely attached to the spinal cord. A subdural space is generally only present due to trauma and/or pathological situations. The subarachnoid space is filled with cerebrospinal fluid and contains the vessels that supply the spinal cord, namely the anterior spinal artery and the paired posterior spinal arteries, accompanied by corresponding spinal veins. The anterior and posterior spinal arteries form anastomoses known as the vasocorona of the spinal cord and these supply nutrients to the canal. The epidural space contains loose fatty tissue, and a network of large, thin-walled blood vessels called the internal vertebral venous plexuses.

== Clinical significance ==
Spinal stenosis is a narrowing of the canal which can occur in any region of the spine and can be caused by a number of factors. It may result in cervical myelopathy if the narrowed canal impinges on the spinal cord itself.

Spinal canal endoscopy can be used to investigate the epidural space, and is an important spinal diagnostic technique.

== History ==
The spinal canal was first described by Jean Fernel.
