= Vertebral foramen =

Anatomical part of the vertebra

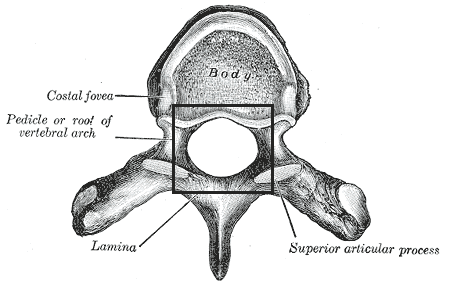
- A typical thoracic vertebra, viewed from above. (Vertebral foramen is the large hole at the center.)

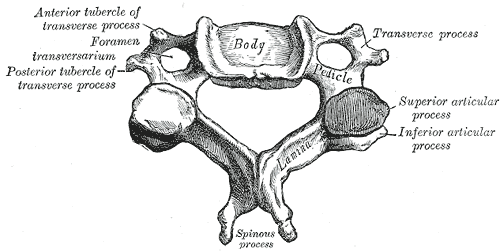
- A cervical vertebra. (Vertebral foramen is the large hole at the center.)

Details

Identifiers
- Latin: foramen vertebrale
- TA98: A02.2.01.011
- TA2: 1022
- FMA: 13479

In a typical vertebra, the vertebral foramen is the foramen (opening) of a vertebra bounded ventrally/anteriorly by the body of the vertebra, and the dorsally/posteriorly by the vertebral arch.

In the articulated spine, the successive vertebral foramina of the stacked vertebrae (together with adjacent structures) collectively form the spinal canal (vertebral canal) which lodges the spinal cord and its meninges as well as spinal nerve roots and blood vessels.

== See also ==
- Atlas (anatomy)#Vertebral foramen
