= Vertebral vein =

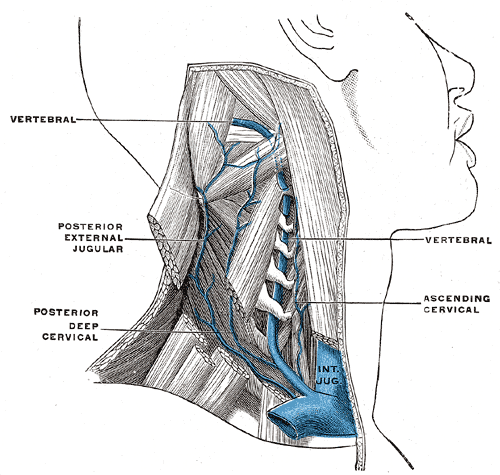
- The vertebral vein. (Vertebral labeled at upper left and center right.)

Details
- Source: Deep cervical vein
- Drains to: Brachiocephalic vein
- Artery: Vertebral artery

Identifiers
- Latin: vena vertebralis
- TA98: A12.3.04.012
- TA2: 4780
- FMA: 4727

The vertebral vein is formed in the suboccipital triangle, from numerous small tributaries which spring from the internal vertebral venous plexuses and issue from the vertebral canal above the posterior arch of the atlas.

They unite with small veins from the deep muscles at the upper part of the back of the neck, and form a vessel which enters the foramen in the transverse process of the atlas, and descends, forming a dense plexus around the vertebral artery, in the canal formed by the transverse foramina of the upper six cervical vertebrae.

This plexus ends in a single trunk, which emerges from the transverse foramina of the sixth cervical vertebra, and opens at the root of the neck into the back part of the innominate vein near its origin, its mouth being guarded by a pair of valves.

On the right side, it crosses the first part of the subclavian artery.

== Additional images ==
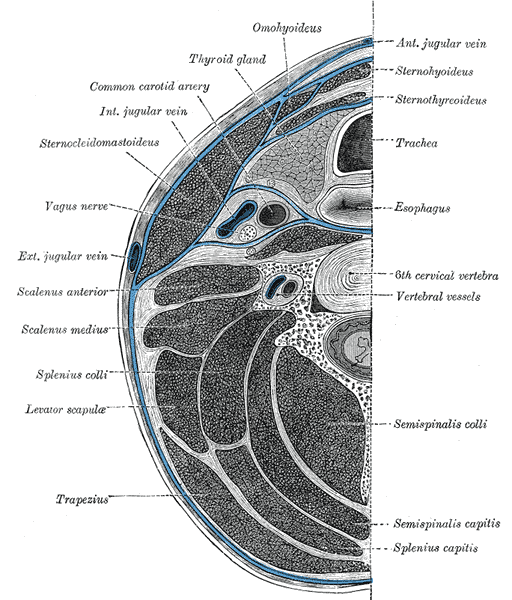
Section of the neck at about the level of the sixth cervical vertebra.
