= Aperture (disambiguation) =

The aperture of an optical system is the opening that limits the amount of light that can pass through.

Aperture may also refer to:

== Science and technology ==
- In anatomy, a number of apertures in the human body:
  - Apertura nasalis posterior
  - Apertura pelvis inferior
  - Apertura pelvis minoris
  - Apertura pelvis superior
  - Apertura thoracis inferior
  - Apertura thoracis superior
  - Lateral aperture (foramen of Luschka), an opening in each lateral extremity of the lateral recess of the fourth ventricle of the human brain
  - Median aperture (foramen of Magendie), which drains cerebrospinal fluid (CSF) from the fourth ventricle into the cisterna magna
- Antenna aperture, a physical parameter of an antenna
- Aperture (mollusc), the main opening in the shell of a gastropod or scaphopod (mollusc)
- Aperture (botany), a weaker spot in the wall of a pollen grain
- Numerical aperture is a parameter used to describe optical systems
- Aperture (computer memory), a region of the physical address space that opens access to a particular device or memory unit
- Aperture (software), an image organization and editing program for photographers, sold by Apple Inc.

== Music ==
- Aperture (Hannah Jadagu album), 2023
- Aperture (The Head and the Heart album), 2025
- "Aperture" (song), by Harry Styles (2026)
- "Aperture", a song by Emily Blue (2020)

== Other uses ==
- Aperture (magazine), a long-running art photography magazine
- Aperture (typography), an opening in a partially enclosed loop in a typographical symbol, such as the opening to the right in the letter 'C' or at the top of the letter 'U'
- Aperture Foundation, a photography nonprofit
- Aperture Science, a fictional organization featured in the Portal video game series
- Aperture Peak
- The Aperture, a restaurant in Cincinnati, Ohio

== See also ==
- Aputure, a lighting company
