= Linea terminalis =

Anatomical structure of the pelvic bones

- Pelvis, with dotted line marking linea terminalis

Details

Identifiers
- Latin: linea terminalis pelvis
- TA98: A02.5.02.007
- TA2: 1288
- FMA: 17002

The linea terminalis or innominate line consists of the pubic crest, pectineal line (pecten pubis), the arcuate line, the sacral ala, and the sacral promontory.

It is the pelvic brim, which is the edge of the pelvic inlet. The pelvic inlet is typically used to divide the abdominopelvic cavity into an abdominal (above the inlet) and a pelvic cavity (below the inlet). Sometimes, the pelvis cavity is considered to extend above the pelvic inlet, and in this case the pelvic inlet is used to divide the pelvic cavity into a false (above the inlet) and a true pelvis (below the inlet).

== Additional images ==
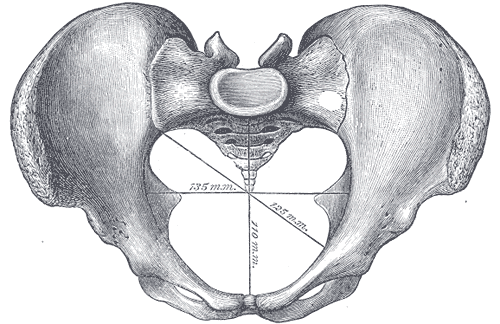
Diameters of superior aperture of lesser pelvis—female

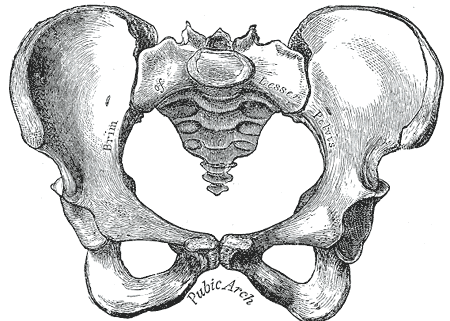
Female pelvis
