= Iliopubic eminence =

Bone protrusion within the pelvis

Iliopectineal eminence
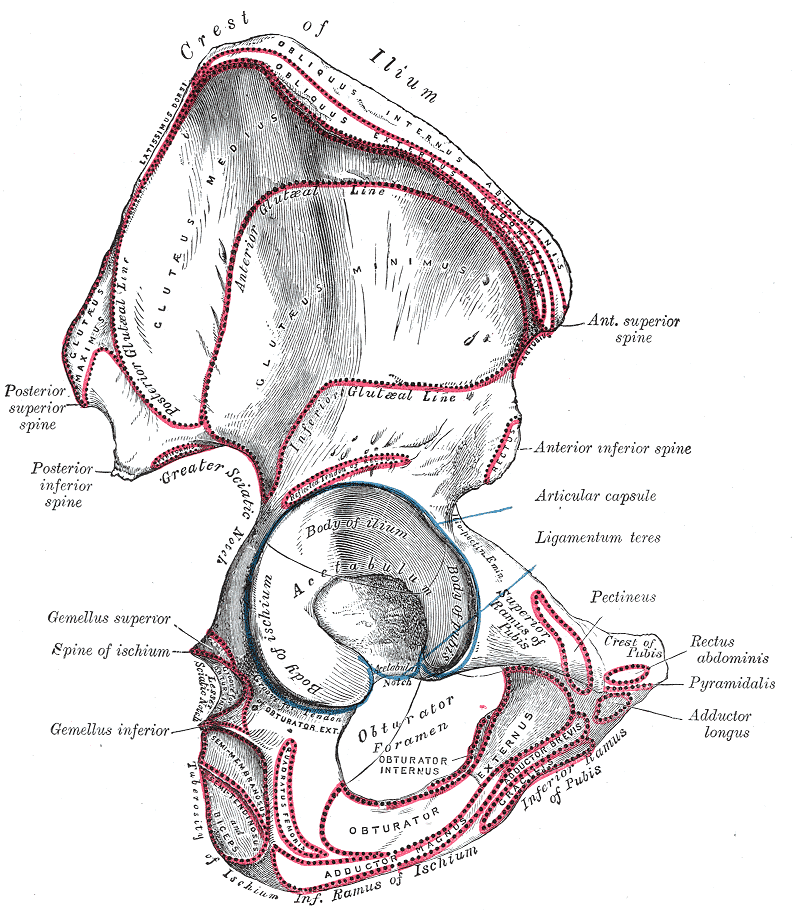
- Right hip bone. External surface. (Iliopectineal eminence visible at center right.)

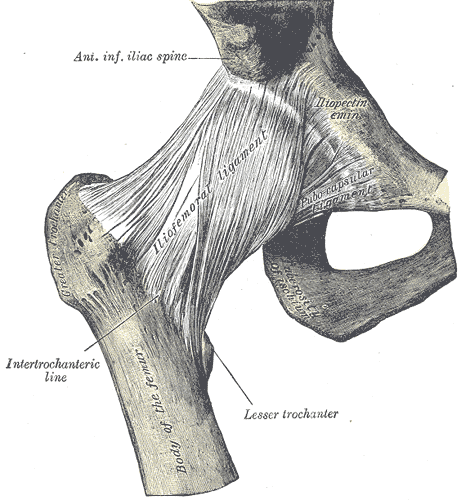
- Right hip-joint from the front. (Iliopectineal emin. labeled at upper right.)

Details

Identifiers
- Latin: eminentia iliopubica
- TA98: A02.5.01.307
- TA2: 1352
- FMA: 16907

Medial to the anterior inferior iliac spine is a broad, shallow groove, over which the iliacus and psoas major muscles pass. This groove is bounded medially by an eminence, the iliopubic eminence (or iliopectineal eminence), which marks the point of union of the ilium and pubis.

It constitutes a lateral border of the pelvic inlet.

The iliopectineal line is the border of the eminence.

The psoas minor, when present, inserts at the pectineal line of the eminence.

== Additional images ==
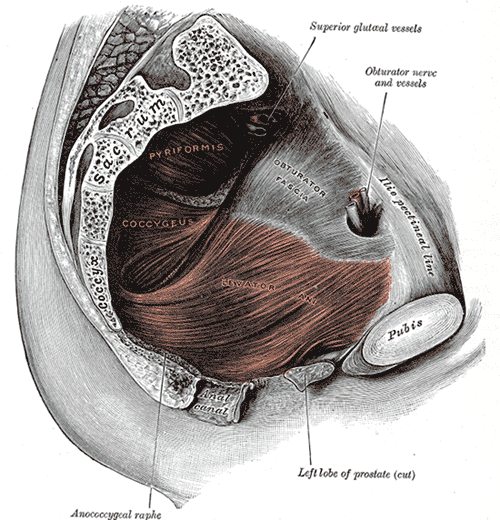
Left levator ani from within

Pelvis

== See also ==
- Iliofemoral ligament
