= Aperture of pelvis =

Aperture of pelvis may refer to:

- Pelvic inlet, or superior aperture of the pelvis
- Pelvic outlet, or inferior aperture of the pelvis
