= Sacrum =

Bone of the spine

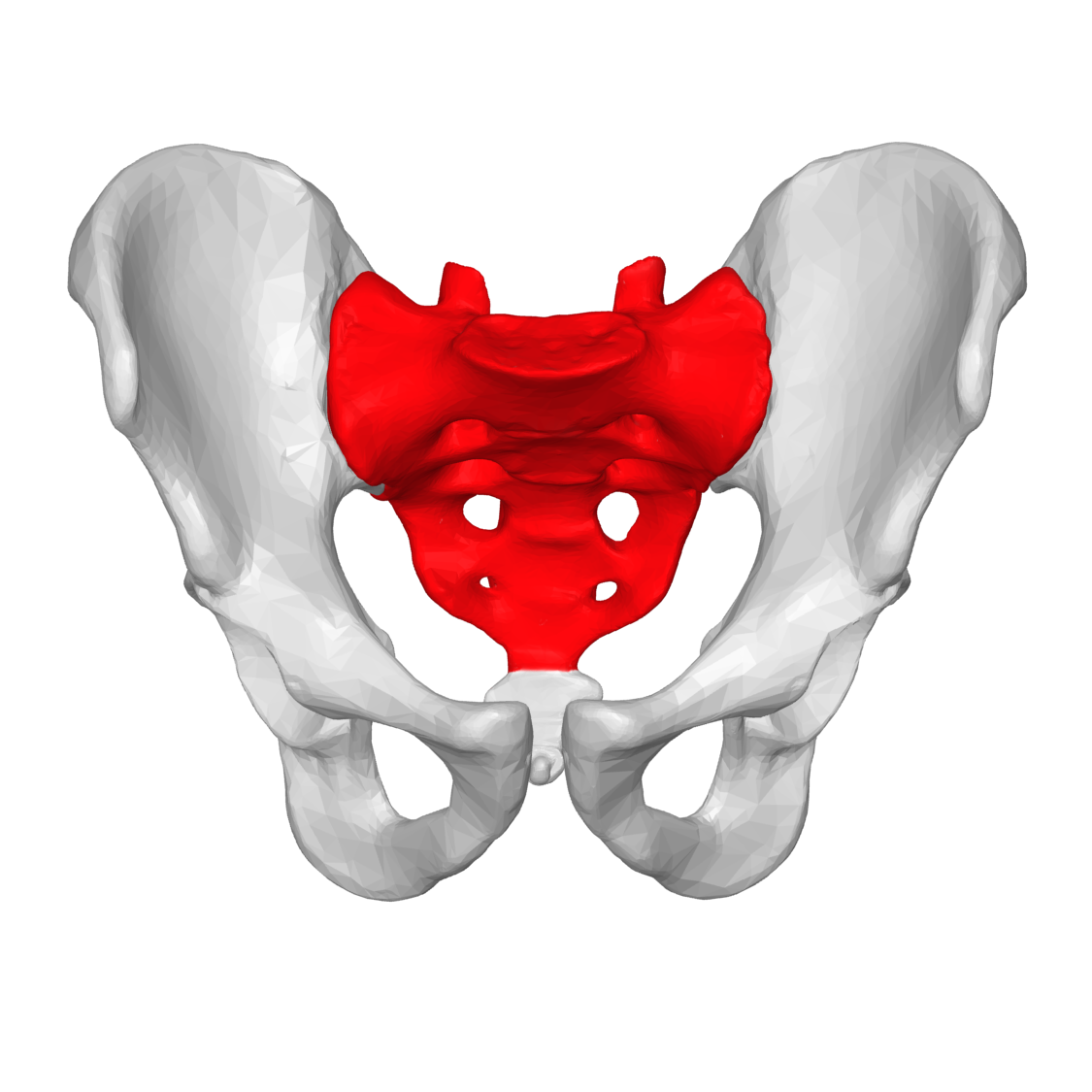
- Position of the sacrum in the pelvis

- Animation of the sacrum in the human skeleton

Details
- Pronunciation: (/ˈsækrəm/ or /ˈseɪkrəm/)
- Location: Base of the vertebral column

Identifiers
- Latin: os sacrum
- MeSH: D012447
- TA98: A02.2.05.001
- TA2: 1071
- FMA: 16202

The sacrum (pl.: sacra or sacrums), in human anatomy, is a triangular bone at the base of the spine that forms by the fusing of the sacral vertebrae (S1–S5) between ages 18 and 30.

The sacrum situates at the upper, back part of the pelvic cavity, between the two wings of the pelvis. It forms joints with four other bones. The two projections at the sides of the sacrum are called the alae (wings), and articulate with the ilium at the L-shaped sacroiliac joints. The upper part of the sacrum connects with the last lumbar vertebra (L5), and its lower part with the coccyx (tailbone) via the sacral and coccygeal cornua.

The sacrum has three different surfaces which are shaped to accommodate surrounding pelvic structures. Overall, it is concave (curved upon itself). The base of the sacrum, the broadest and uppermost part, is tilted forward as the sacral promontory internally. The central part is curved outward toward the posterior, allowing greater room for the pelvic cavity.

In all other quadrupedal vertebrates, the pelvic vertebrae undergo a similar developmental process to form a sacrum in the adult, even while the bony tail (caudal) vertebrae remain unfused. The number of sacral vertebrae varies slightly. For instance, the S1–S5 vertebrae of a horse will fuse, the S1–S3 of a dog will fuse, and four pelvic vertebrae of a rat will fuse between the lumbar and the caudal vertebrae of its tail.

== Structure ==
The sacrum is a complex structure providing support for the spine and accommodation for the spinal nerves. It also articulates with the hip bones. The sacrum has a base, an apex, and three surfaces – a pelvic, dorsal and a lateral surface. The base of the sacrum, which is broad and expanded, is directed upward and forward. On either side of the base is a large projection known as an ala of sacrum and these alae (wings) articulate with the sacroiliac joints. The alae support the psoas major muscles and the lumbosacral trunk which connects the lumbar plexus with the sacral plexus. In the articulated pelvis, the alae are continuous with the iliac fossa. Each ala is slightly concave from side to side, and convex from the back and gives attachment to a few of the fibers of the iliacus muscle. The posterior quarter of the ala represents the transverse process, and its anterior three-quarters the costal process of the first sacral segment. Each ala also serves as part of the border of the pelvic brim. The alae also form the base of the lumbosacral triangle. The iliolumbar ligament and lumbosacral ligaments are attached to the ala.

In the middle of the base is a large oval articular surface, the upper surface of the body of the first sacral vertebra, which is connected with the under surface of the body of the last lumbar vertebra by an intervertebral fibrocartilage. Behind this is the large triangular orifice of the sacral canal, which is completed by the lamina and spinous process of the first sacral vertebra. The superior articular processes project from it on either side; they are oval, concave, directed backward and medialward, like the superior articular processes of a lumbar vertebra. They are attached to the body of the first sacral vertebra and to each ala, by short thick pedicles; on the upper surface of each pedicle is a vertebral notch, which forms the lower part of the foramen between the last lumbar and first sacral vertebrae.

The apex is directed downward and presents an oval facet for articulation with the coccyx. The sacral canal as a continuation of the vertebral canal runs throughout the greater part of the sacrum. The sacral angle is the angle formed by the true conjugate (the anteroposterior diameter of the pelvic inlet) with the first two pieces of the sacrum. Normally, it is greater than 90 degrees. A sacral angle of lesser degree suggests an anteriorly inclined sacrum, leading to funneling (progressive narrowing) of the pelvic canal toward the outlet.

=== Promontory ===
The sacral promontory marks part of the border of the pelvic inlet, and comprises the iliopectineal line and the linea terminalis. The sacral promontory articulates with the last lumbar vertebra to form the sacrovertebral angle, an angle of 30 degrees from the horizontal plane that provides a useful marker for a sling implant procedure.

=== Surfaces ===
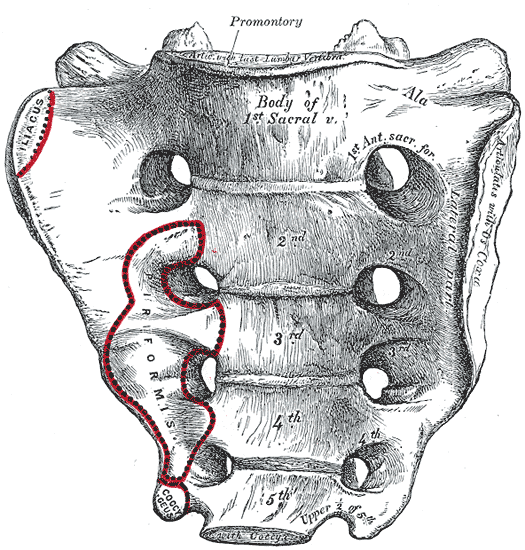
Pelvic surface

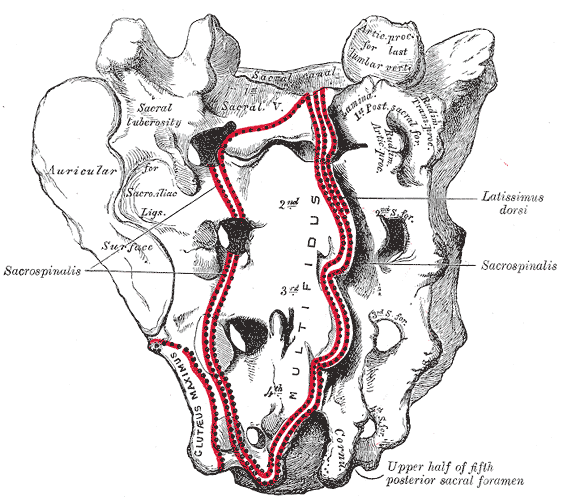
Dorsal surface (multifidus muscle attachment in red outline)

The pelvic surface of the sacrum is concave from the top, and curved slightly from side to side. Its middle part is crossed by four transverse ridges, which correspond to the original planes of separation between the five sacral vertebrae. The body of the first segment is large and has the form of a lumbar vertebra; the bodies of the next bones get progressively smaller, are flattened from the back, and curved to shape themselves to the sacrum, being concave in front and convex behind. At each end of the transverse ridges, are the four anterior sacral foramina, diminishing in size in line with the smaller vertebral bodies. The foramina give exit to the anterior divisions of the sacral nerves and entrance to the lateral sacral arteries. Each part at the sides of the foramina is traversed by four broad, shallow grooves, which lodge the anterior divisions of the sacral nerves. They are separated by prominent ridges of bone which give origin to the piriformis muscle. If a sagittal section be made through the center of the sacrum, the bodies are seen to be united at their circumferences by bone, wide intervals being left centrally, which, in the fresh state, are filled by the intervertebral discs.

The dorsal surface of the sacrum is convex and narrower than the pelvic surface. In the middle line is the median sacral crest, surmounted by three or four tubercles—the rudimentary spinous processes of the upper three or four sacral vertebrae. On either side of the median sacral crest is a shallow sacral groove, which gives origin to the multifidus muscle. The floor of the groove is formed by the united laminae of the corresponding vertebrae. The laminae of the fifth sacral vertebra, and sometimes those of the fourth, do not meet at the back, resulting in a fissure known as the sacral hiatus in the posterior wall of the sacral canal. The sacral canal is a continuation of the spinal canal and runs throughout the greater part of the sacrum. Above the sacral hiatus, it is triangular in form. The canal lodges the sacral nerves, via the anterior and posterior sacral foramina.

On the lateral aspect of the sacral groove is a linear series of tubercles produced by the fusion of the articular processes which together form the indistinct medial sacral crest. The articular processes of the first sacral vertebra are large and oval-shaped. Their facets are concave from side to side, face to the back and middle, and articulate with the facets on the inferior processes of the fifth lumbar vertebra.

The tubercles of the inferior articular processes of the fifth sacral vertebra, known as the sacral cornua, are projected downward and are connected to the cornua of the coccyx. At the side of the articular processes are the four posterior sacral foramina; they are smaller in size and less regular in form than those at the front, and transmit the posterior divisions of the sacral nerves. On the side of the posterior sacral foramina is a series of tubercles, the transverse processes of the sacral vertebrae, and these form the lateral sacral crest. The transverse tubercles of the first sacral vertebra are large and very distinct; they, together with the transverse tubercles of the second vertebra, give attachment to the horizontal parts of the posterior sacroiliac ligaments; those of the third vertebra give attachment to the oblique fasciculi of the posterior sacroiliac ligaments; and those of the fourth and fifth to the sacrotuberous ligaments.

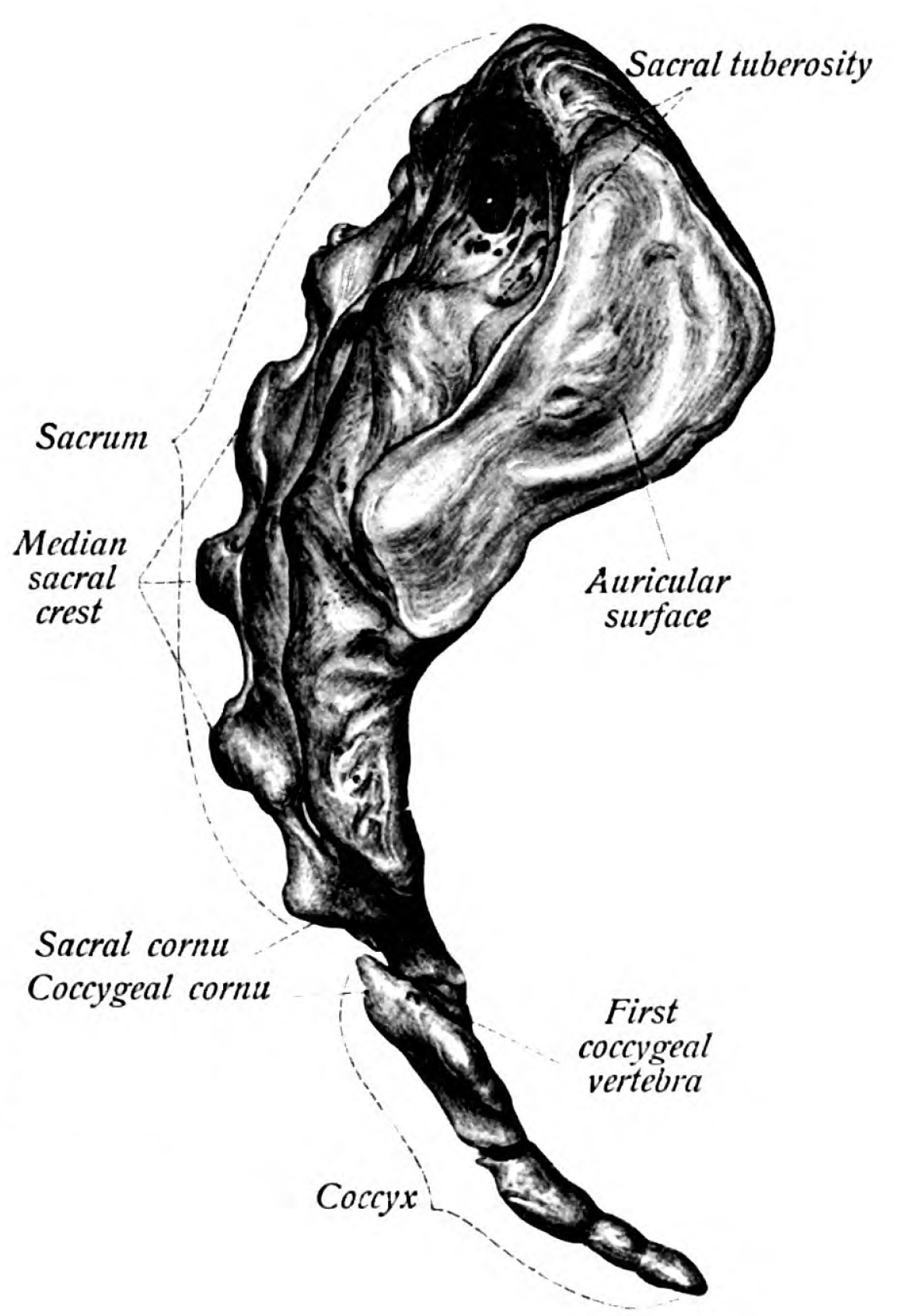
Lateral surface

The lateral surface of the sacrum is broad above, but narrows into a thin edge below. The upper half presents in front an ear-shaped surface, the auricular surface, covered with cartilage in the immature state, for articulation with the ilium. Behind it is a rough surface, the sacral tuberosity, on which are three deep and uneven impressions, for the attachment of the posterior sacroiliac ligament. The lower half is thin, and ends in a projection called the inferior lateral angle. Medial to this angle is a notch, which is converted into a foramen by the transverse process of the first piece of the coccyx, and this transmits the anterior division of the fifth sacral nerve. The thin lower half of the lateral surface gives attachment to the sacrotuberous and sacrospinous ligaments, to some fibers of the gluteus maximus at the back and to the coccygeus in the front.

=== Articulations ===
The sacrum articulates with four bones:

- the last lumbar vertebra above
- the coccyx (tailbone) below
- the ilium portion of the hip bone on either side

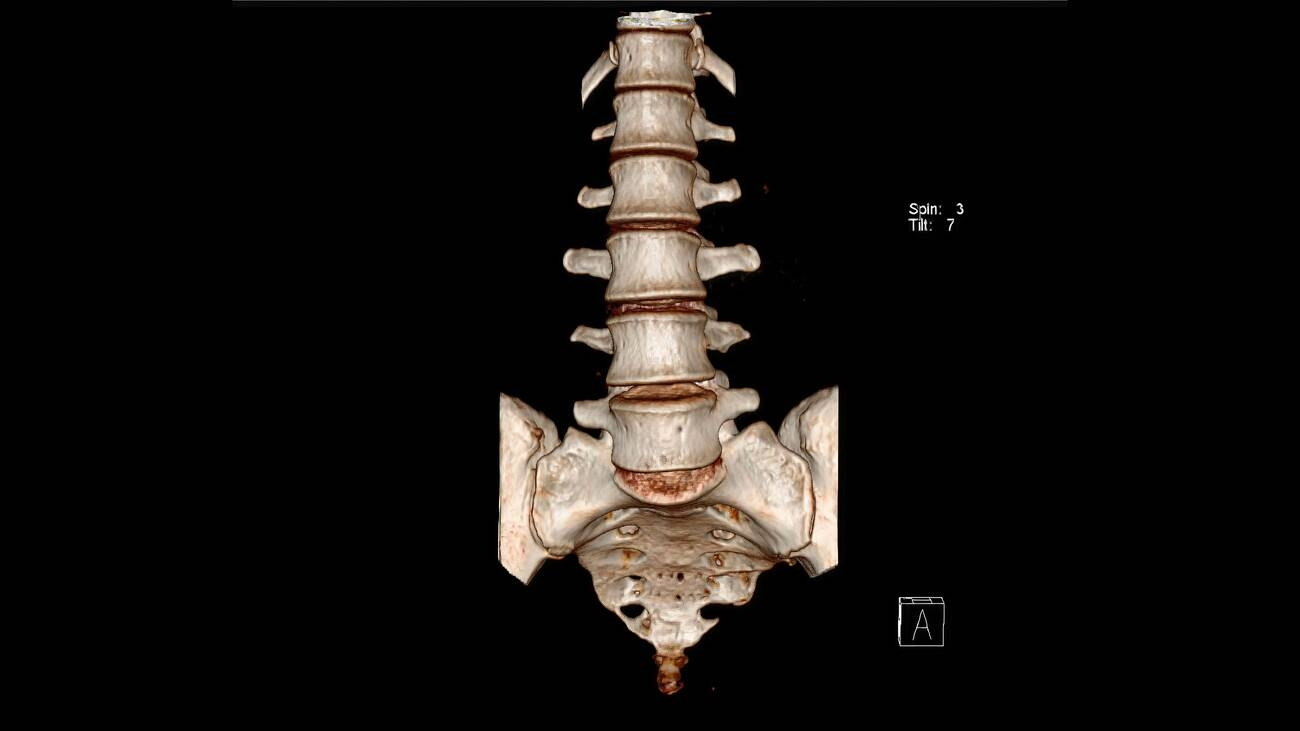
Anterior view of a 3D volume-rendered CT reconstruction displaying the lumbosacral junction, illustrating the articulation of the fifth lumbar vertebra onto the base of the sacrum.

Rotation of the sacrum superiorly and anteriorly whilst the coccyx moves posteriorly relative to the ilium is sometimes called "nutation" (from the Latin term nutatio which means "nodding") and the reverse, postero-inferior motion of the sacrum relative to the ilium whilst the coccyx moves anteriorly, "counter-nutation". In upright vertebrates, the sacrum is capable of slight independent movement along the sagittal plane. On bending backward the top (base) of the sacrum moves forward relative to the ilium; on bending forward the top moves back.

The sacrum refers to all of the parts combined. Its parts are called sacral vertebrae when referred individually.

=== Variations ===
In some cases, the sacrum will consist of six pieces or be reduced in number to four. The bodies of the first and second vertebrae may fail to unite.

=== Development ===
The somites that give rise to the vertebral column begin to develop from head to tail along the length of the notochord. At day 20 of embryogenesis, the first four pairs of somites appear in the future occipital bone region. Developing at the rate of three or four a day, the next eight pairs form in the cervical region to develop into the cervical vertebrae; the next twelve pairs will form the thoracic vertebrae; the next five pairs the lumbar vertebrae and by about day 29, the sacral somites will appear to develop into the sacral vertebrae; finally on day 30, the last three pairs will form the coccyx.

== Clinical significance ==
=== Congenital disorders ===
The congenital disorder spina bifida occurs as a result of a defective embryonic neural tube, characterised by the incomplete closure of vertebral arch or of the incomplete closure of the surface of the vertebral canal. The most common sites for spina bifida malformations are the lumbar and sacral areas.

Another congenital disorder is that of caudal regression syndrome also known as sacral agenesis. This is characterised by an abnormal underdevelopment in the embryo (occurring by the seventh week) of the lower spine. Sometimes part of the coccyx is absent, or the lower vertebrae can be absent, or on occasion a small part of the spine is missing with no outward sign.

=== Fracture ===
Sacral fractures are relatively uncommon; however, they are often associated with neurological deficits. In the presence of neurological signs, they are mostly treated with surgical fixation.

=== Cancer ===
The sacrum is one of the main sites for the development of the sarcomas known as chordomas that are derived from the remnants of the embryonic notochord.

== Other animals ==
In dogs, the sacrum is formed by three fused vertebrae. The sacrum in the horse is made up of five fused vertebrae. In birds, the sacral vertebrae are fused with the lumbar and some caudal and thoracic vertebrae to form a single structure called the synsacrum. In the frog, the ilium is elongated and forms a mobile joint with the sacrum that acts as an additional limb to give more power to its leaps.

== Terminology ==
English sacrum was introduced as a technical term in anatomy in the mid-18th century, as a shortening of the Late Latin name os sacrum "sacred bone", itself a translation of Greek ἱερόν ὀστέον, the term found in the writings of Galen. Prior to the adoption of sacrum, the bone was also called holy bone in English, paralleling German heiliges Bein or Heiligenbein (alongside Kreuzbein) and Dutch heiligbeen.

The origin of Galen's term is unclear. Supposedly the sacrum was the part of an animal offered in sacrifice (since the sacrum is the seat of the organs of procreation). Others attribute the adjective ἱερόν to the ancient belief that this specific bone would be indestructible. As the Greek adjective ἱερός may also mean "strong", it has also been suggested that os sacrum is a mistranslation of a term intended to mean "the strong bone". This is supported by the alternative Greek name μέγας σπόνδυλος by the Greeks, translating to "large vertebra", translated into Latin as vertebra magna.

In Classical Greek the bone was known as κλόνις (Latinized clonis); this term is cognate to Latin clunis "buttock", Sanskrit śróṇis "haunch" and Lithuanian šlaunis "hip, thigh". The Latin word is found in the alternative Latin name of the sacrum, ossa clunium, as it were "bones of the buttocks". Due to the fact that the os sacrum is broad and thick at its upper end, the sacrum is alternatively called os latum, "broad bone".

== Additional images ==
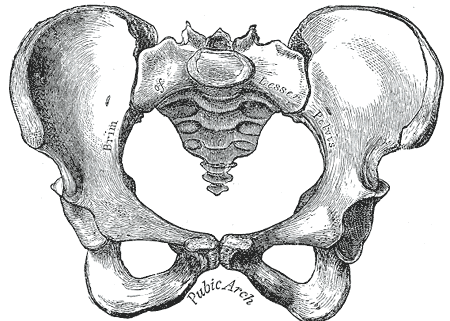
Image of a female pelvis seen anteriorly, sacrum at centre.

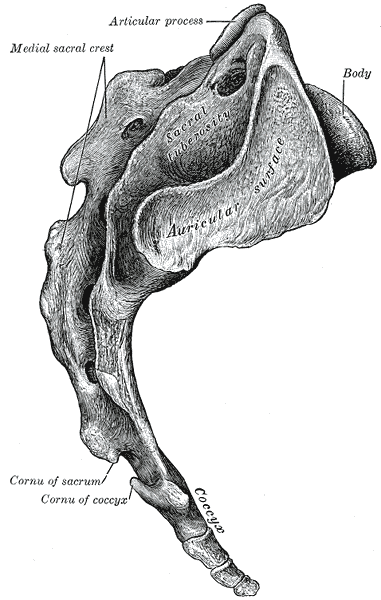
Lateral surfaces of sacrum and coccyx.

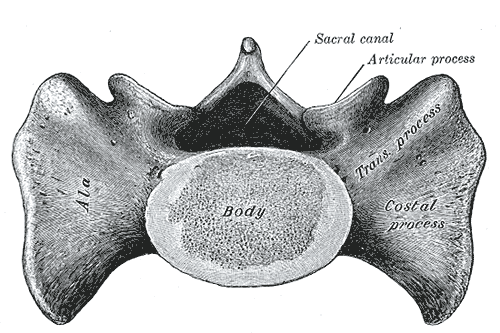
Base of sacrum.

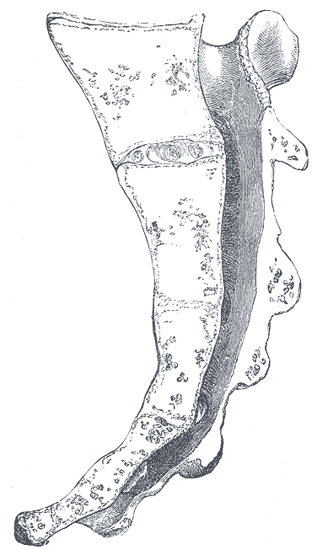
Median sagittal section of the sacrum.

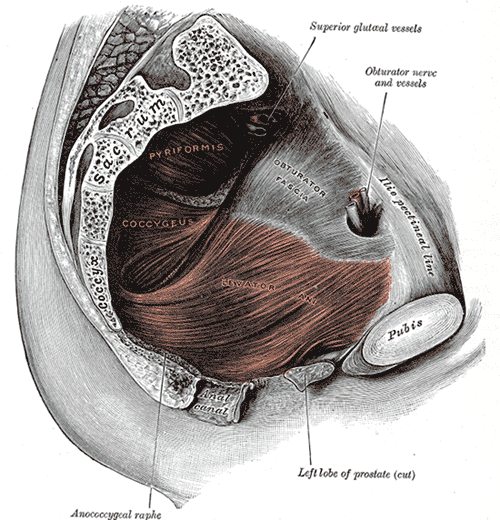
Left levator ani from within.

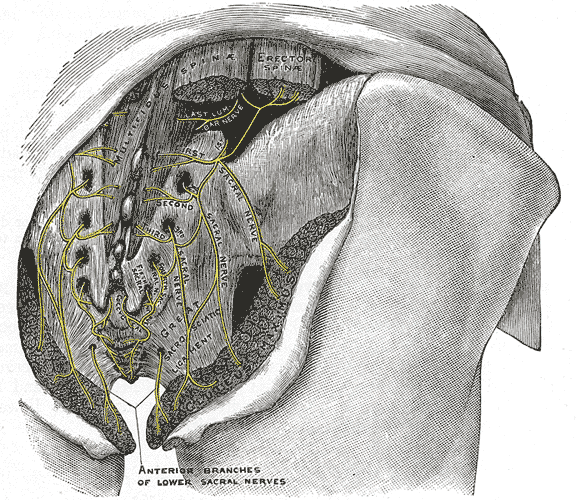
The posterior divisions of the sacral nerves.

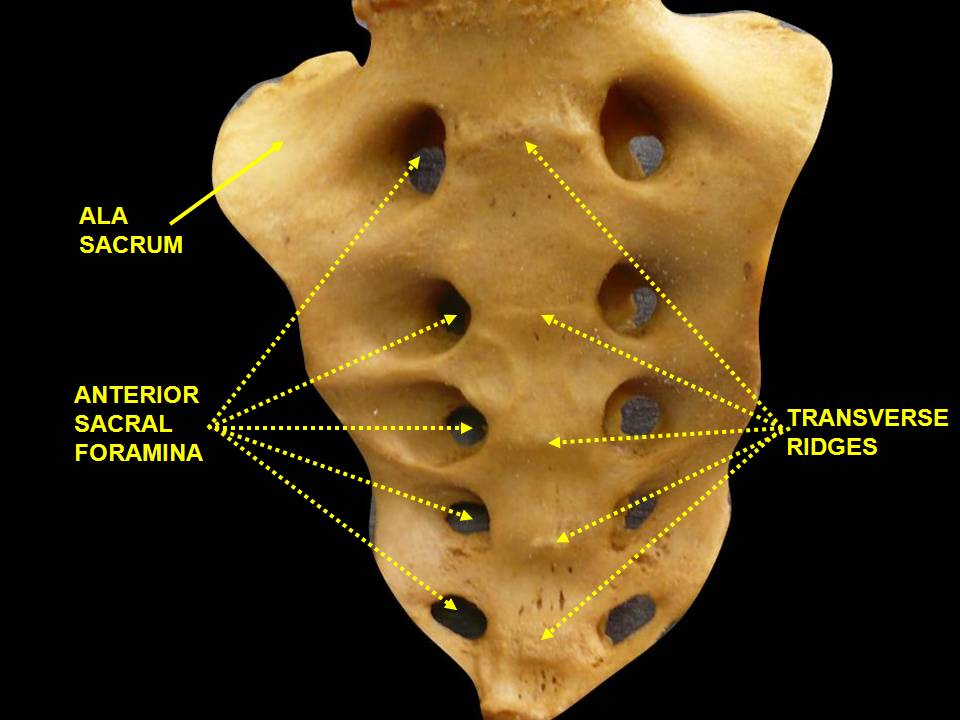
Sacrum. Pelvic surface.

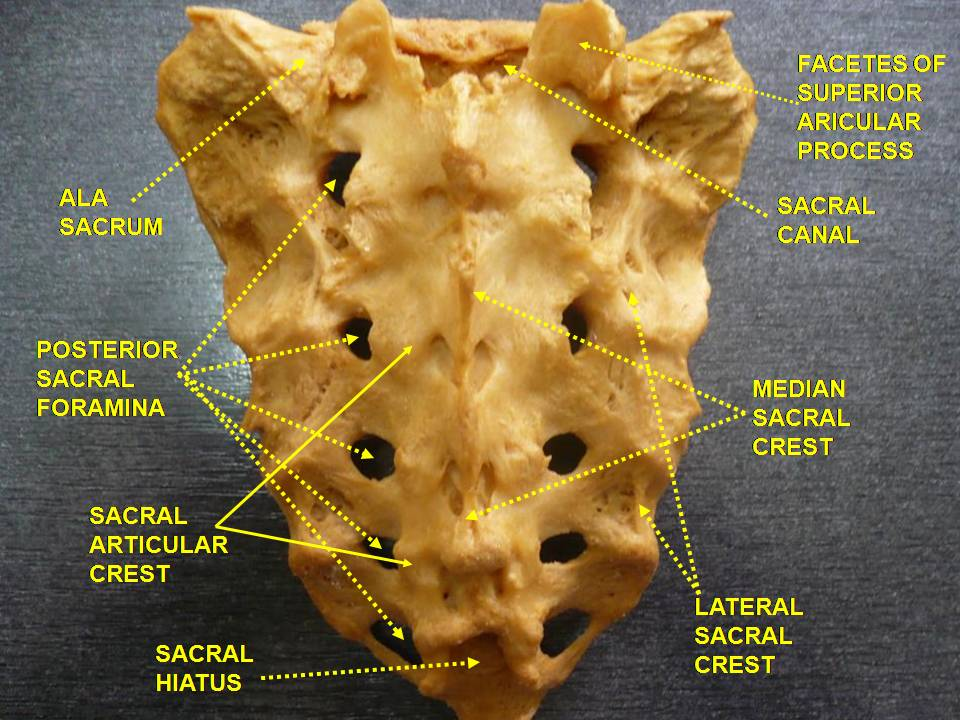
Sacrum. Dorsal surface.

Sacrum anatomy

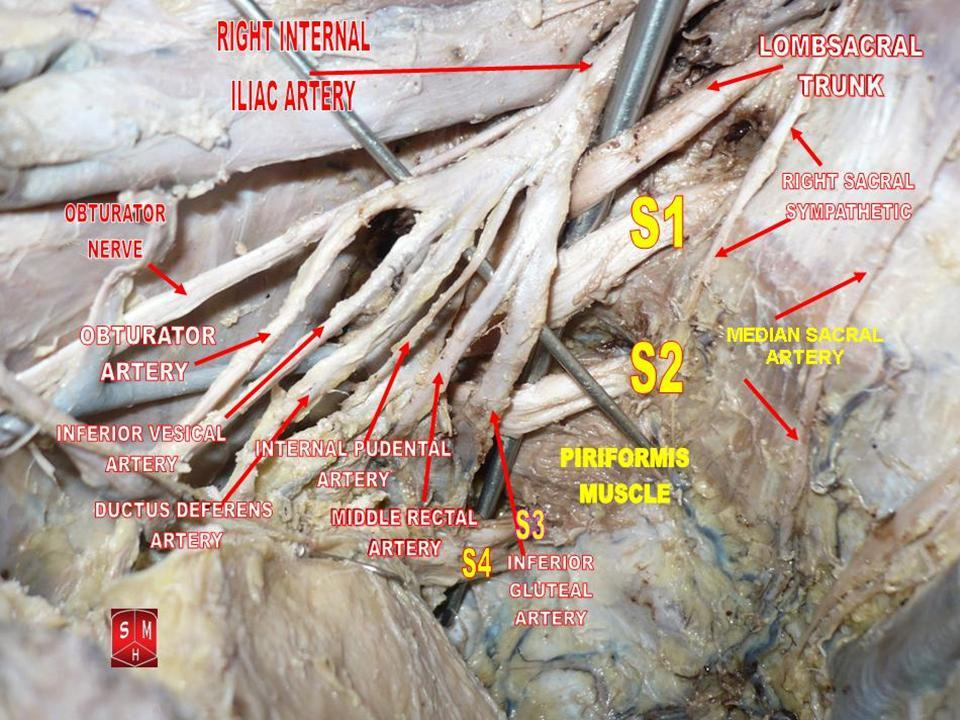
Sacrum (not labeled) seen on the right with sacral nerves, median sacral artery, and rectum on the lower left.

== See also ==
- Bone terminology
- Pelvimetry
- Rump (croup)
