= Pelvimetry =

Measurement of the female pelvis

- Purpose: measurement of female pelvis

Pelvimetry is the measurement of the female pelvis. It can theoretically identify cephalo-pelvic disproportion, which is when the capacity of the pelvis is inadequate to allow the fetus to negotiate the birth canal. However, clinical evidence indicate that all pregnant people should be allowed a trial of labor regardless of pelvimetry results.

== Indication ==
Theoretically, pelvimetry may identify cephalo-pelvic disproportion, which is when the capacity of the pelvis is inadequate to allow the fetus to negotiate the birth canal. However, a female's pelvis loosens up before birth (with the help of hormones).

A Cochrane review in 2017 found that there was too little evidence to show whether X-ray pelvimetry is beneficial and safe when the baby is in cephalic presentation.

A review in 2003 came to the conclusion that pelvimetry does not change the management of pregnant people, and recommended that all pregnant people should be allowed a trial of labor regardless of pelvimetry results. It considered routine performance of pelvimetry to be a waste of time, a potential liability, and an unnecessary discomfort.

== Components ==
The terms used in pelvimetry are commonly used in obstetrics. Clinical pelvimetry attempts to assess the pelvis by clinical examination. Pelvimetry can also be done by radiography and MRI.

Low-dose 3D-rendered CT scans can be used for estimating the main pelvimetry parameters:

Parameter		Maximum intensity projections	Thin slices	End points	Normal measures
Pelvic inlet	Transverse diameter of the pelvic inlet		Coronal plane	The iliopectineal lines, at widest transverse distance.	13 to 14.5 cm.
Pelvic inlet	Obstetric conjugate	Median plane, 20 mm thick	Same, but may require minor side-to-side scrolling to visualize both end points.	The line between the closest bony points of the sacral promontory and the pubic bone next to the symphysis	10 to 12 cm.
Interspinous distance			Axial plane	The line between the closest bone points of the ischial spines	9.5 to 11.5 cm.
Pelvic outlet	Sagittal pelvic outlet diameter		Same, but may require minor side-to-side scrolling to visualize both end points.	The closest bony points of the sacrococcygeal joint and the pubic bone next to the symphysis. This is also called the obstetric anteroposterior diameter of the pelvic outlet, to distinguish from the anatomic one which includes the coccyx. However, the coccyx is normally pushed away during childbirth by laxity in the sacrococcygeal joint.	9.5 to 11.5 cm.
Pelvic outlet	Intertuberous diameter		Axial plane	The closest bony points of the ischial tuberosities	10 to 12 cm.

== History ==
Pelvimeter

Male pelvis	Female pelvis
Comparison between an android (left) and a gynecoid pelvis (right).

Traditional obstetrical services relied heavily on pelvimetry in the conduct of delivery in order to decide if natural or operative vaginal delivery was possible or if and when to use a cesarean section. Women whose pelvises were deemed too small received caesarean sections instead of birthing naturally.

Traditional obstetrics have characterized four types of pelvises:

- Gynecoid: Ideal shape, with round to slightly oval (obstetrical inlet slightly less transverse) inlet.
- Android: triangular inlet, and prominent ischial spines, more angulated pubic arch.
- Anthropoid: the widest transverse diameter is less than the anteroposterior (obstetrical) diameter.
- Platypelloid: Flat inlet with shortened obstetrical diameter.

== See also ==
- Childbirth
- List of obstetric topics
- Pelvic Bone Width
- Human pelvis
- Pregnancy
- Pubic symphysis
- Sacroiliac joint
- Sacrum
