= Pelvic brim =

Boundary of the pelvic inlet

- The edge of the pelvic inlet (shown in red) is the pelvic brim

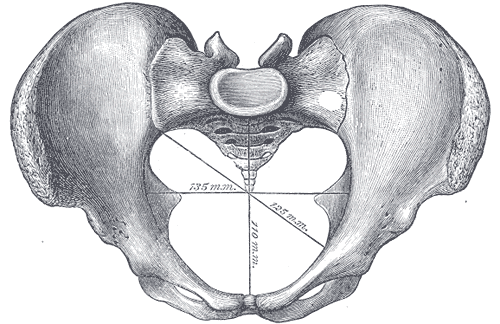
- Diameters of superior aperture of lesser pelvis -- female. (Pelvic brim is not labeled, but is identifiable as the central opening at the top.)

Identifiers
- FMA: 224780

The pelvic brim is the edge of the pelvic inlet. It is an approximately butterfly-shaped line passing through the prominence of the sacrum, the arcuate and pectineal lines, and the upper margin of the pubic symphysis.

== Structure ==
The pelvic brim is an approximately butterfly-shaped line passing through the prominence of the sacrum, the arcuate and pectineal lines, and the upper margin of the pubic symphysis.

The pelvic brim is obtusely pointed in front, diverging on either side, and encroached upon behind by the projection forward of the promontory of the sacrum.

The oblique plane passing approximately through the pelvic brim divides the internal part of the pelvis (pelvic cavity) into the false or greater pelvis and the true or lesser pelvis. The false pelvis, which is above that plane, is sometimes considered to be a part of the abdominal cavity, rather than a part of the pelvic cavity. In this case, the pelvic cavity coincides with the true pelvis, which is below the above-mentioned plane.

The urinary bladder lies just above the anterior pelvic brim. The sigmoid colon also passes close to the pelvic brim.

== Clinical significance ==
The pelvic brim may be a site of compression of structures that pass through the pelvic inlet. This can include the femoral nerves, which may occur during abdominal surgery.

== See also ==
- Linea terminalis
- Pelvis justo major
- Pelvic inlet

== Additional images ==
Pelvis
