= Pelvic outlet =

Part of the pelvis

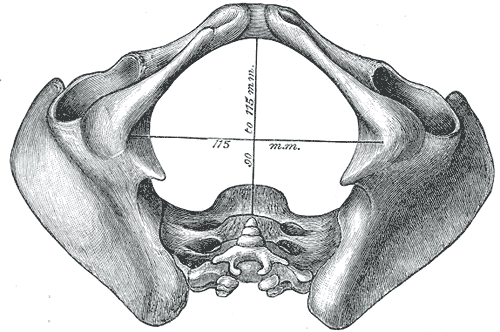
- Diameters of inferior aperture of lesser pelvis (female)

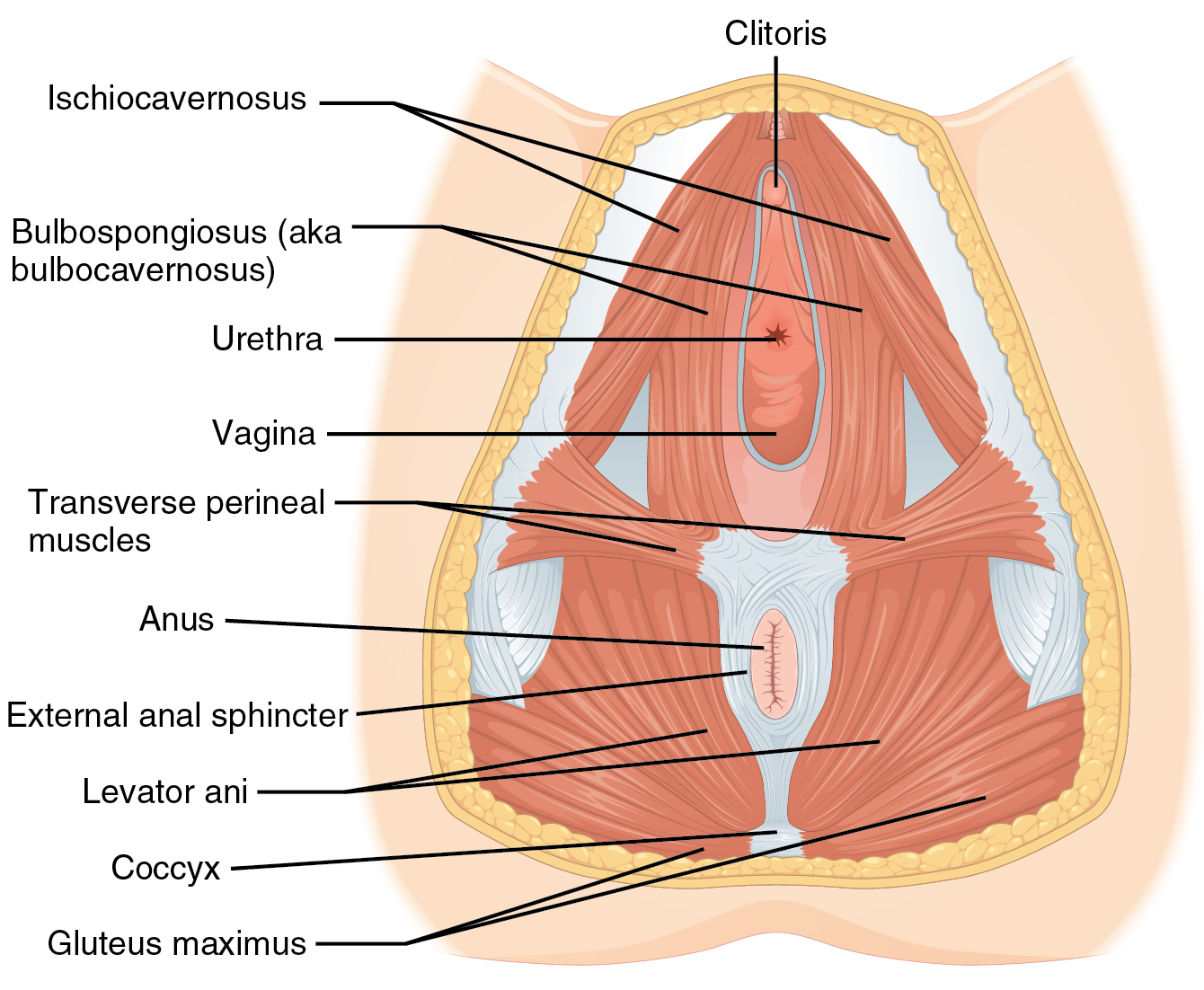
- Muscles of the female perineum

Details

Identifiers
- Latin: apertura pelvis inferior
- TA98: A02.5.02.009
- TA2: 1290
- FMA: 17273

The lower circumference of the lesser pelvis is very irregular; the space enclosed by it is named the inferior aperture or pelvic outlet. It is an important component of pelvimetry.

== Boundaries ==
It has the following boundaries:

- anteriorly: the pubic arch
- laterally: the ischial tuberosities
- posterolaterally: the inferior margin of the sacrotuberous ligament
- posteriorly: the anterior border of the middle of the coccyx.

== Notches ==
These eminences are separated by three notches:

- one in front, the pubic arch, formed by the convergence of the inferior rami of the ischium and pubis on either side.
- The other notches, one on either side, are formed by the sacrum and coccyx behind, the ischium in front, and the ilium above; they are called the sciatic notches; in the natural state they are converted into foramina by the sacrotuberous and sacrospinous ligaments.

== In situ ==
When the ligaments are in situ, the inferior aperture of the pelvis is lozenge-shaped, bounded as follows:

- in front, by the pubic arcuate ligament and the inferior rami of the pubes and ischia
- laterally, by the ischial tuberosities
- behind, by the sacrotuberous ligaments and the tip of the coccyx.

== See also ==
- Pelvic inlet

== Additional images ==
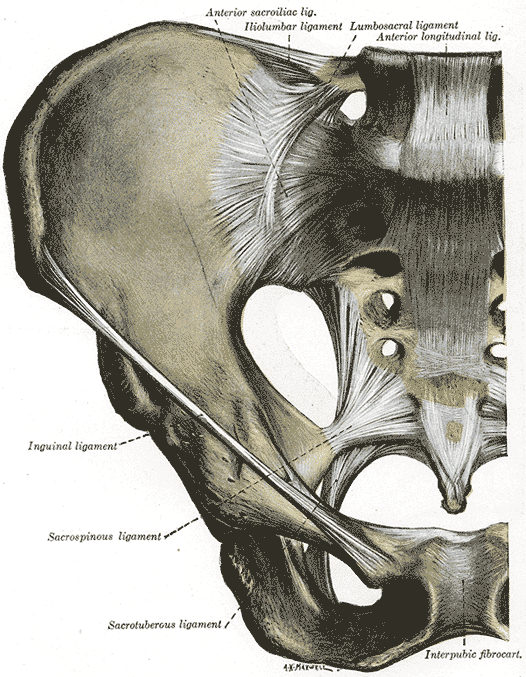
Articulations of pelvis. Anterior view.

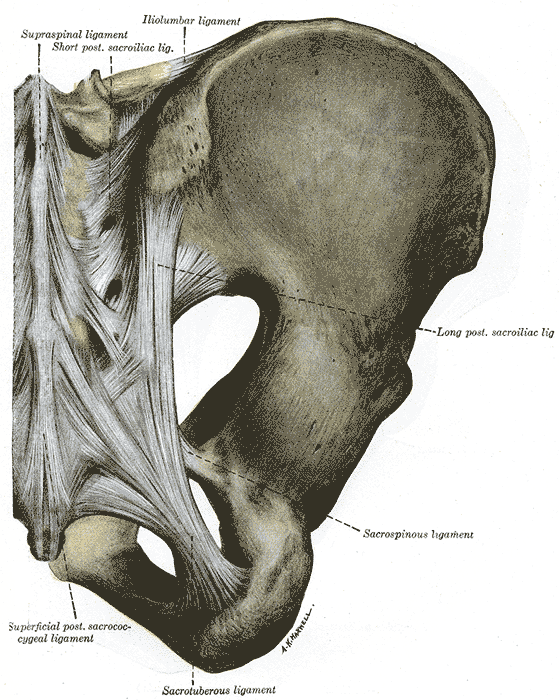
Articulations of pelvis. Posterior view.

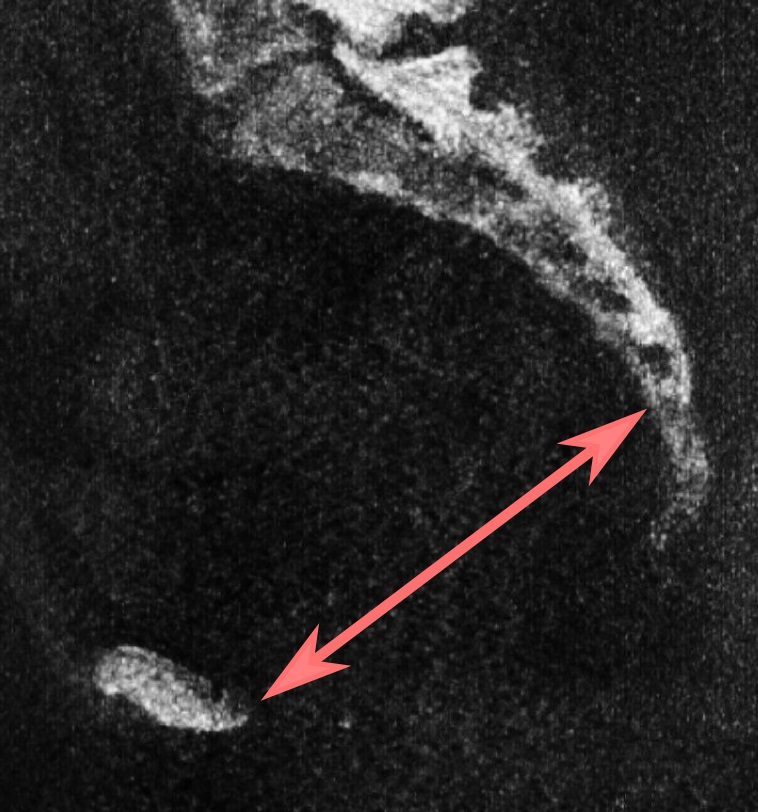
Low-dose CT scan of sagittal pelvic outlet diameter as part of pelvimetry

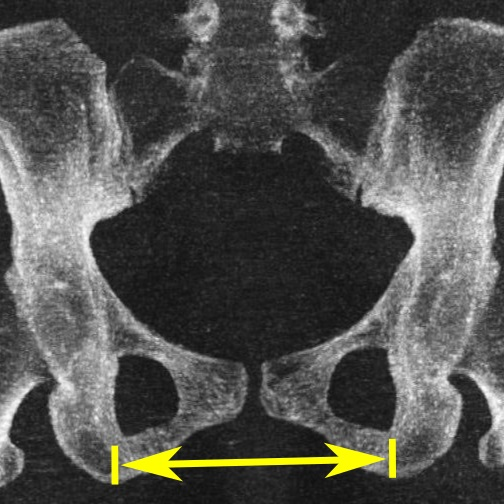
Intertuberous diameter, as a measure of the transverse measure of the pelvic outlet
