= Iliac branch of iliolumbar artery =

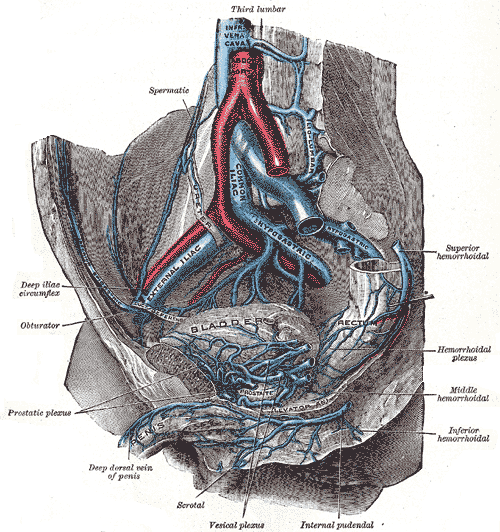
- The veins of the right half of the male pelvis. (Iliolumbar artery not labeled, but Iliolumbar vein visible at center right.)

Details

Identifiers
- Latin: ramus iliacus arteriae iliolumbalis
- TA98: A12.2.15.005
- TA2: 4307
- FMA: 22362

The iliac branch of the iliolumbar artery (ramus iliacus) descends to supply the iliacus muscle; some offsets, running between the muscle and the bone, anastomose with the iliac branches of the obturator artery; one of these enters an oblique canal to supply the bone, while others run along the crest of the ilium, distributing branches to the gluteal and abdominal muscles, and anastomosing in their course with the superior gluteal artery, iliac circumflex artery, and the lateral circumflex femoral artery. This anastamosis occurs around the anterior superior iliac spine.
