= Sacrovertebral angle =

Angle of the lower spine

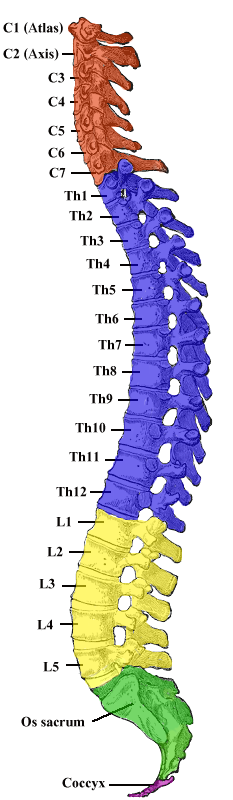
- Lumbar vertebrae are yellow, and sacrum is green.

The sacrum is curved upon itself and placed very obliquely, its base projecting forward and forming the prominent sacrovertebral angle when articulated with the last lumbar vertebra.

It is also known as the "lumbosacral angle".

== See also ==
- Sacral promontory
- Pelvic inlet
