= Pelvic cavity =

Body cavity bounded by the pelvic bones

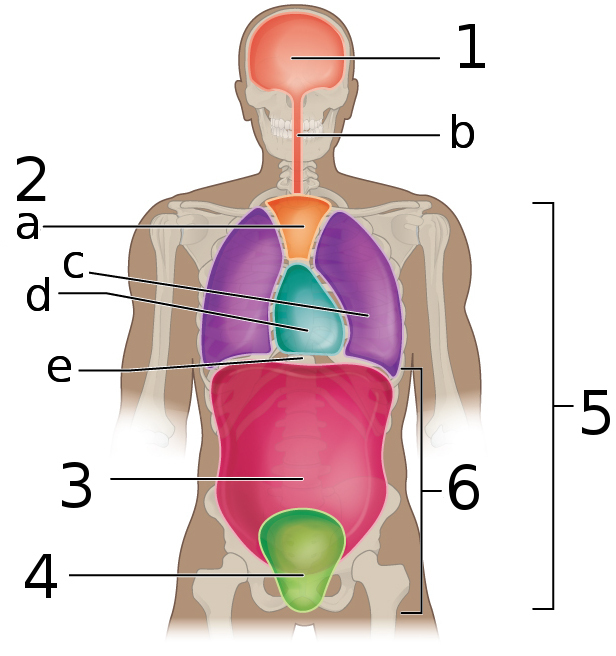
- The various cavities of the human body as seen in a frontal projection, with the pelvic cavity labeled 4.

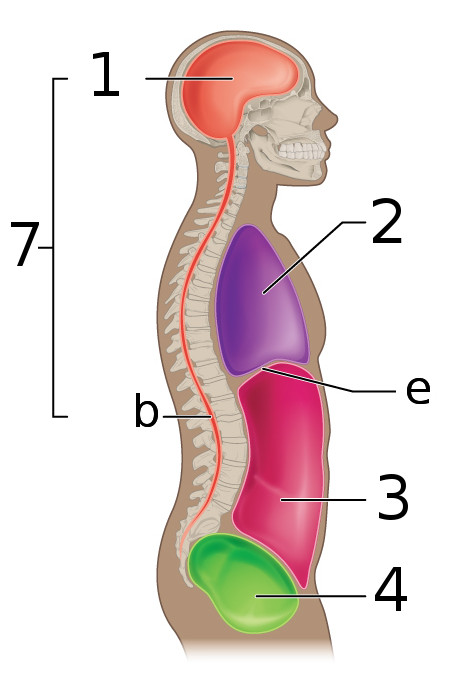
- The various cavities of the human body as seen in a lateral projection, with the pelvic cavity labeled 4.

Details
- Artery: Ovarian artery, internal iliac artery, median sacral artery
- Vein: Internal iliac vein, internal pudendal vein, vesical vein
- Nerve: Inferior hypogastric plexus
- Lymph: Primarily internal iliac lymph nodes

Identifiers
- Latin: cavitas pelvis
- TA98: A02.5.02.002
- TA2: 1283
- FMA: 9738

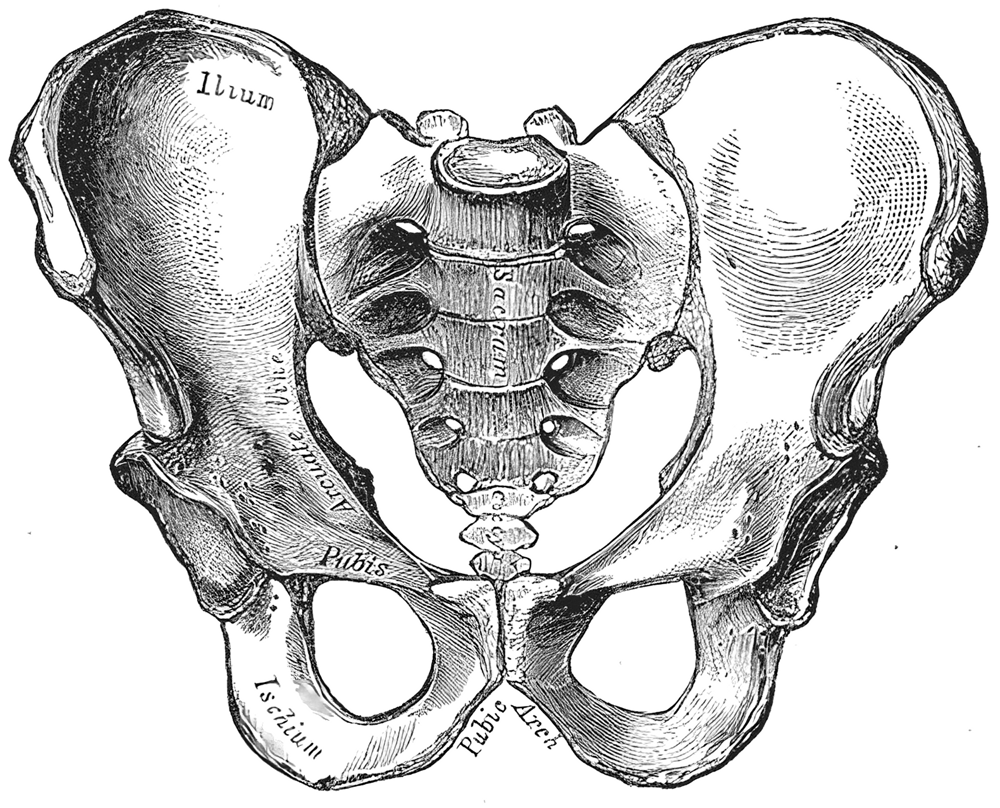
Male pelvis.

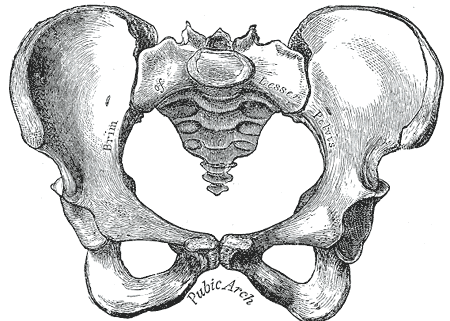
Female pelvis.

The pelvic cavity is a body cavity that is bounded by the bones of the pelvis. Its oblique roof is the pelvic inlet (the superior opening of the pelvis). Its lower boundary is the pelvic floor.

The pelvic cavity primarily contains the reproductive organs, urinary bladder, distal ureters, proximal urethra, terminal sigmoid colon, rectum, and anal canal. In females, the uterus, fallopian tubes, ovaries and upper vagina occupy the area between the other viscera.

The rectum is located at the back of the pelvis, in the curve of the sacrum and coccyx; the bladder is in front, behind the pubic symphysis. The pelvic cavity also contains major arteries, veins, muscles, and nerves. These structures coexist in a crowded space, and disorders of one pelvic component may impact upon another; for example, constipation may overload the rectum and compress the urinary bladder, or childbirth might damage the pudendal nerves and later lead to anal weakness.

== Structure ==
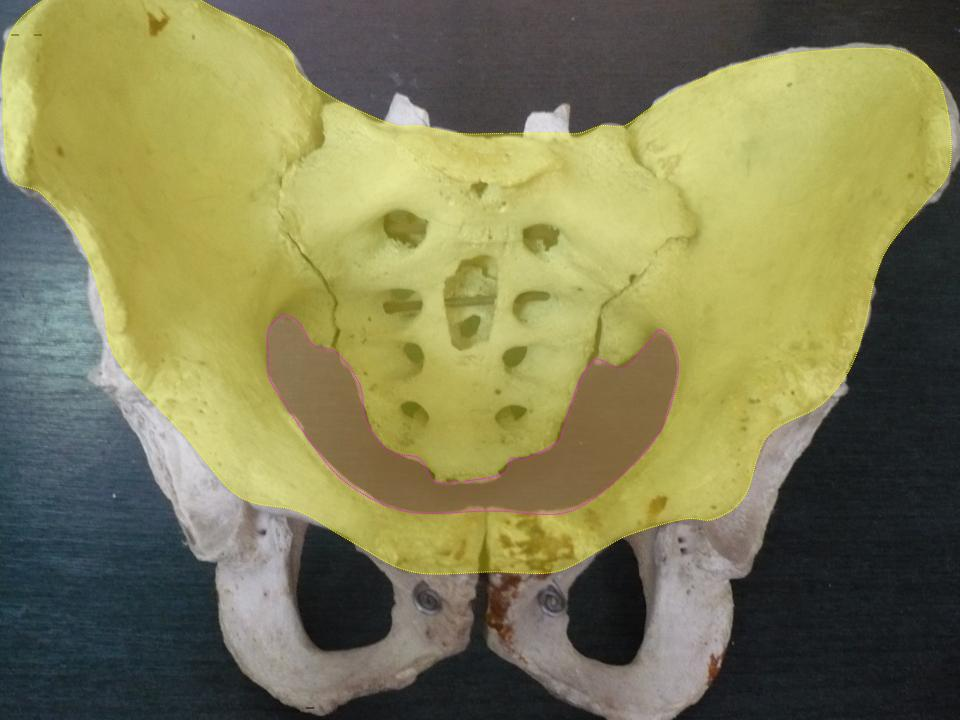
Pelvis

The pelvis has an anteroinferior, a posterior, and two lateral pelvic walls; and an inferior pelvic wall, also called the pelvic floor. The parietal peritoneum is attached here and to the abdominal wall.

=== Lesser pelvis ===
The lesser pelvis (or "true pelvis") is the space enclosed by the pelvic girdle and below the pelvic brim: between the pelvic inlet and the pelvic floor. This cavity is a short, curved canal, deeper on its posterior than on its anterior wall. Some sources consider this region to be the entirety of the pelvic cavity. Other sources define the pelvic cavity as the larger space including the greater pelvis, just above the pelvic inlet.

The lesser pelvis is bounded in front and below by the superior rami of the symphysis pubis; above and behind, by the sacrum and coccyx; and laterally, by a broad, smooth, quadrangular area of bone, corresponding to the inner surfaces of the body and superior ramus of the ischium, and the part of the ilium below the arcuate line.

roof: pelvic brim
| posterior: sacrum, coccyx | lateral: obturator internus | anterior: pubic symphysis |
floor: pelvic floor

The lesser pelvis contains the pelvic colon, rectum, bladder, and some of the sex organs. The rectum is at the back, in the curve of the sacrum and coccyx; the bladder is in front, behind the pubic symphysis. In females, the uterus and vagina occupy the interval between these viscera.

The pelvic splanchnic nerves arising at S2–S4 are in the lesser pelvis.

=== Greater pelvis ===
The greater pelvis (or false pelvis) is the space enclosed by the pelvic girdle above and in front of the pelvic brim. It is bounded on either side by the ilium. In the front, it is incomplete, presenting a wide interval between the anterior borders of the ilia, which is filled by the muscles and fascia of the anterior abdominal wall; behind is a deep notch on either side between the ilium and the base of the sacrum that is filled by the thoracolumbar fascia and associated muscles.

It is generally considered part of the abdominal cavity (which is why it is sometimes called the false pelvis). Some sources consider this region part of the pelvic cavity, while others reframe the classification by calling the combination the abdominopelvic cavity.

The greater pelvis supports the intestines (specifically, the ileum and sigmoid colon), and transmits part of their weight to the anterior wall of the abdomen.

The femoral nerve from L2–L4 is in the greater pelvis, but not in the lesser pelvis.

=== Ligaments ===
| Ligament | From | To |
|---|---|---|
| broad ligament of the uterus | uterus | side of pelvis |
| * mesovarium | ovary | |
| * mesosalpinx | Fallopian tube | broad ligament of the uterus |
| * mesometrium | | |
| cardinal ligament | cervix and vagina | pelvic wall |
| ovarian ligament | ovary | uterus |
| round ligament of the uterus | ovary | travels through inguinal canal, ends at mons pubis |
| suspensory ligament of the ovary | ovary | pelvic wall |

=== Arteries ===
- internal iliac artery
- median sacral artery
- ovarian artery

=== Nerves ===
- sacral plexus
- splanchnic nerves
- femoral nerve (greater pelvis)

== Measurements ==
The pelvis can be classified into four main types by measuring the pelvic diameters and conjugates at the pelvic inlet and outlet and as oblique diameters.

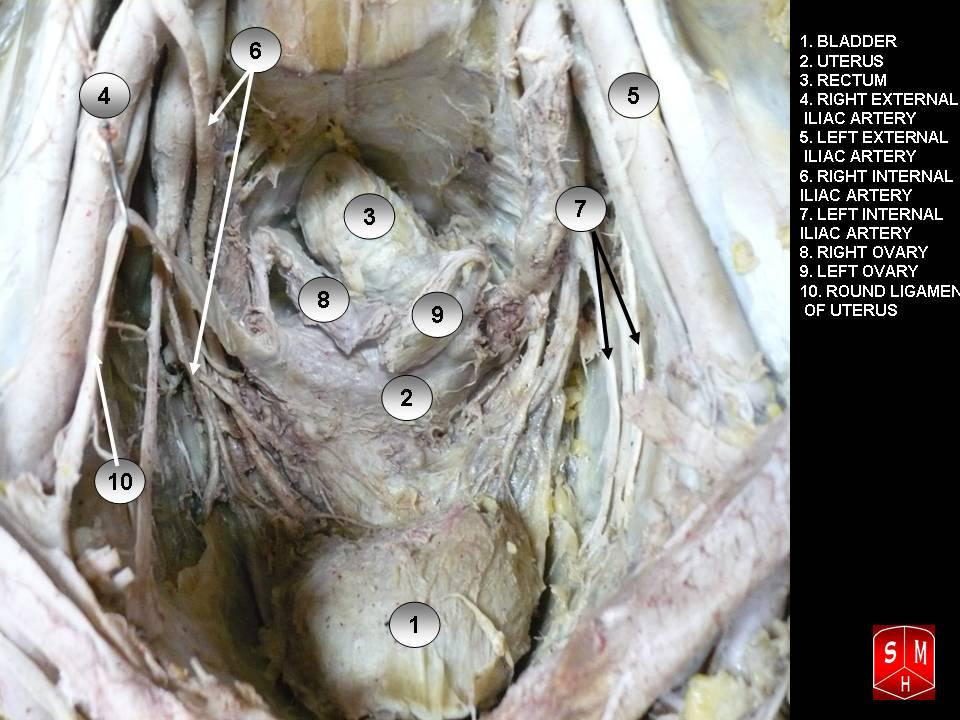
Female pelvic cavity

Pelvic measurements
| Measurement | From | To | Length |
|---|---|---|---|
| Transverse diameter (of inlet) | Between extreme lateral points of pelvic inlet | | 13.5–14 cm |
| Oblique diameter I | Right sacroiliac joint | Left iliopubic eminence | 12-12.5 cm |
| Oblique diameter II | Left sacroiliac joint | Right iliopubic eminence | 11.5–12 cm |
| Anatomical conjugate (true conjugate) | Pubic symphysis | Promontory | ~12 cm |
| Obstetric conjugate | Retropubic eminence (posterior surface of symphysis) | Promontory | >10 cm |
| Diagonal conjugate* | Inferior pubic ligament | Promontory | 11.5–12 cm |
| Straight conjugate | Lower border of symphysis | Tip of coccyx | 9.5–10 cm |
| Median conjugate | Lower border of symphysis | Lower border of sacrum | 11.5 cm |
| Transverse diameter (of outlet) | Between ischial tuberosities | | 10–11 cm |
| Interspinous distance | Between anterior superior iliac spines | | 26 cm (female) |
| Intercristal distance | Between furthest lateral points of iliac crest | | 29 cm (female) |
| External conjugate | Spinous process of fifth lumbar vertebra | Upper edge of symphysis | ~20 cm |
| Intertrochanteric distance | Between femurs | | 31 cm |
Because the true conjugate cannot be measured directly, it is derived from the diagonal conjugate, which is measured through the vagina.

== Additional images ==
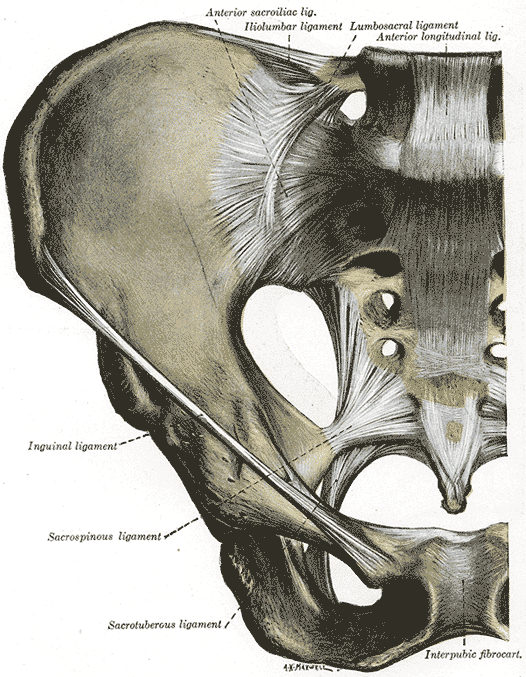
Joints of the pelvis. Anterior view.

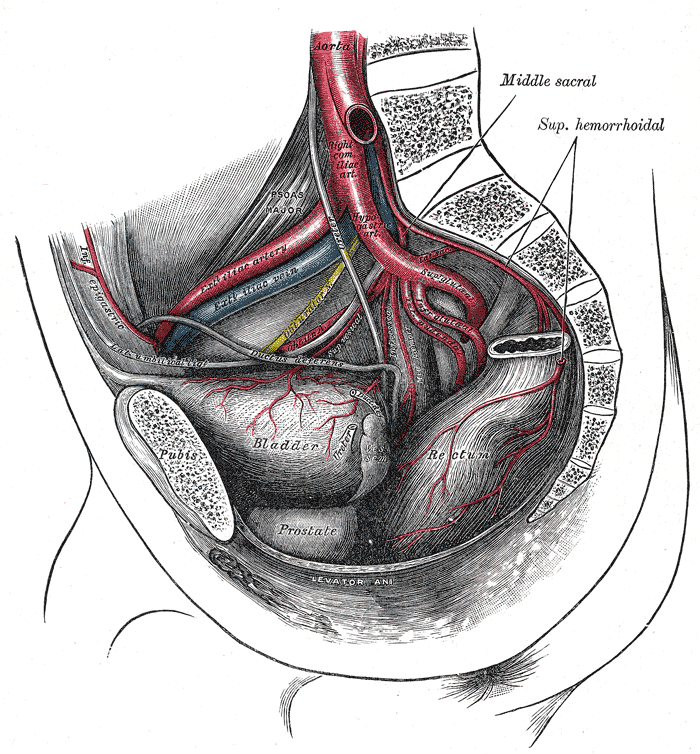
The arteries of the pelvis.

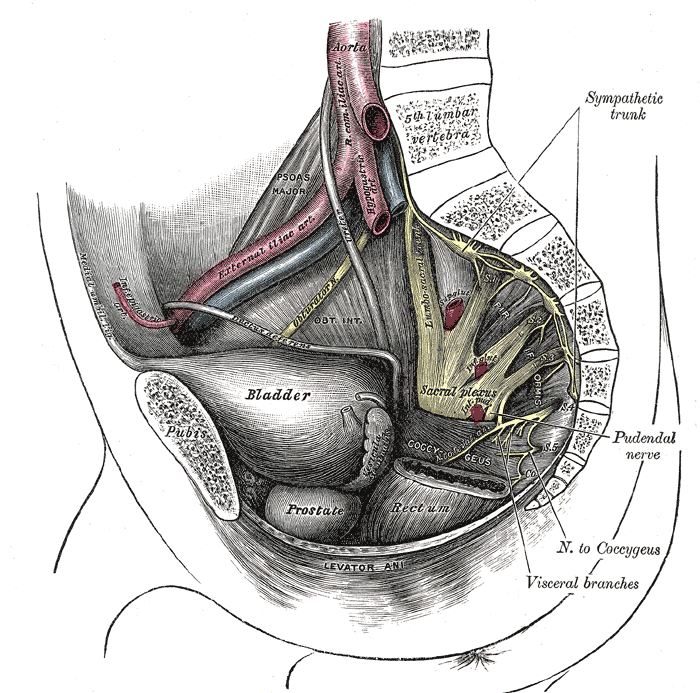
Dissection of side wall of pelvis showing sacral and pudendal plexuses.

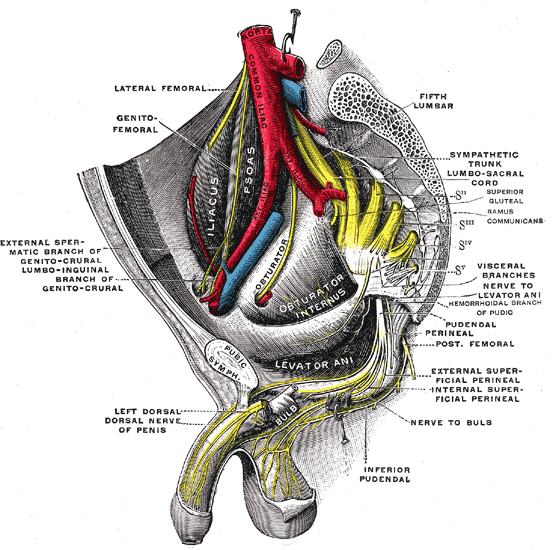
Sacral plexus of the right side.

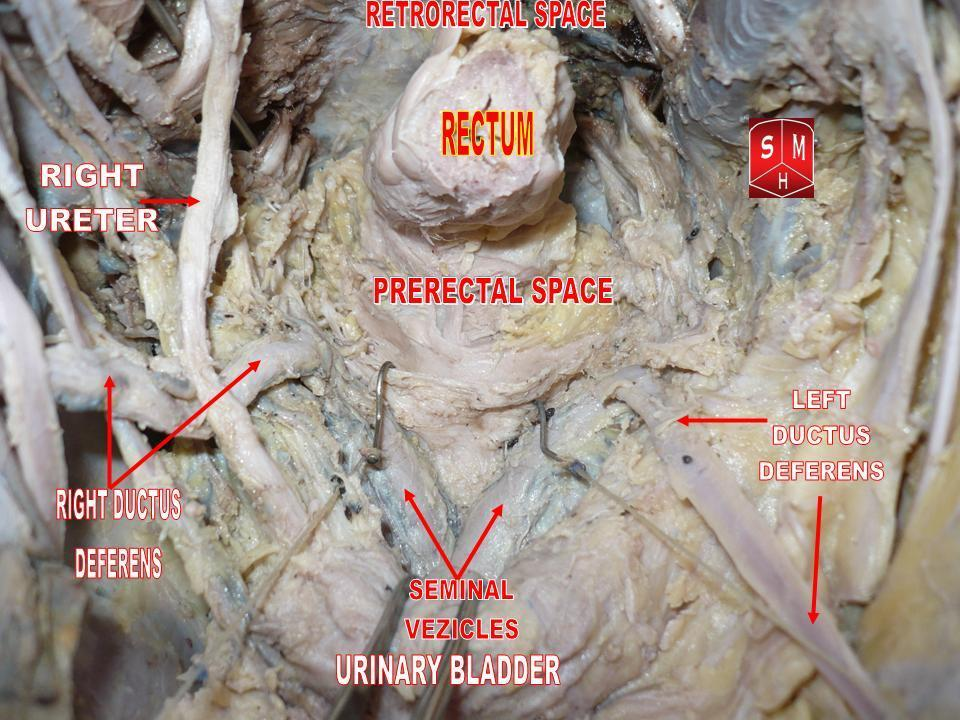
Male pelvic cavity

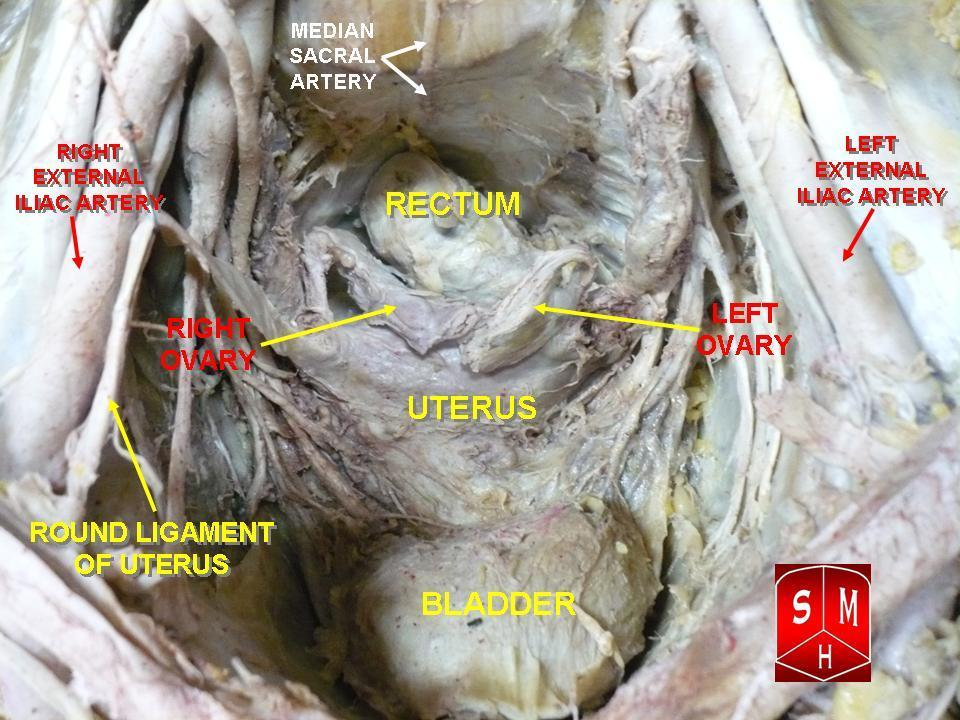
Female pelvic cavity

Lateral projection of the human body cavities, with the line separating the abdominal and pelvic cavities shown.
