= Aputure =

Company producing lighting fixtures etc. for the film industry

- Type: Private
- Industry: Film production
- Founded: 2013; 13 years ago
- Founders: Ian Xie, Ted Sim, and Hellen Liu
- Headquarters: Los Angeles, California, United States
- Number of locations: Los Angeles, California and Shenzhen, China
- Area served: Worldwide
- Key people: Ian Xie (CEO, Founder); Ted Sim (President, Founder); Hellen Liu (COO, Founder)
- Products: Lighting equipment, Industrial design, Software services
- Subsidiaries: Amaran, sidus link, deity microphones
- Website: www.aputure.com www.sidus.link

Aputure (/ˈæpətʃər/) is an American company that is a designer and manufacturer of cinema lighting. It provides lighting fixtures, light-shaping accessories and lighting software.

Its products are used in studio and on location film sets along with in photography and live production. The company is based in California and has a manufacturing plant in Shenzhen, China and offices in a number of countries.

== History ==
=== Foundation and origin ===
Aputure was started by Ian Xie, Ted Sim and Helen Liu.

The company was founded in 2005 when Xie first began the company as an online electronics store and used his hobbyist knowledge to keep up with camera-related trends and technology. With the growth of this business, Xie started creating small camera accessories like monitors and adapters before moving on to light-emitting diodes also known as LED. During this project, Xie travelled to Los Angeles where he met with Ted Sim and other Los Angeles filmmakers to develop his initial designs. Within three years, the team was contracted by several large cinema manufacturers to begin producing light fixtures under their own in-house brands, many of which became the first-ever companies to introduce LED lighting to studios and production houses.

The early team joined Xie and Sim with color scientists from Fujifilm and cinematographers from Los Angeles. Together, they engaged in product development of high-fidelity LEDs instead of low color renditioning diodes which were common at the time.

In 2014, Aputure was founded. Its name was a play on combining the cinematography term "aperture" with "future."

=== Lighting fixtures ===
Originally, Aputure continued to create light fixtures for other brands. However, the design and manufacturing company soon began developing a product of their own to bring to the market.

The result was Aputure's first lighting product, the Amaran series of LED panels. Amaran panels were lightweight fixtures that differed from traditional cinema lighting that was almost always heavy and intended exclusively for use by studio crews.

In 2016, Aputure created the Lightstorm series, their first studio-grade line of lighting fixtures. By 2017, they introduced their flagship lights—the Lightstorm 120d and Lightstorm 300d. The Lightstorm 300d has won several awards such as "Best in Show" at major trade shows like NAB.

== Organization ==
=== Offices and manufacturing ===
Aputure has offices worldwide, including stages and local support in Los Angeles, Shenzhen, Amsterdam, Singapore, Beijing, Bangalore and São Paulo. Through its in-house design team, the company has been able to design and produce products in other areas of cinematography such as light-shaping accessories and microphones.

=== Four-Minute Film School ===
In 2014, Aputure launched a series of educational videos that taught filmmakers how to light both corporate and narrative videos titled Four-Minute Film School. Other series titles include Start Learning Cinematography and Ask Aputure. Hosted by Ted Sim and Valentina Vee, guest instructors have are cinematographers that have worked with Nike, Adidas, and Visa.

=== Light This Location ===
In 2019, Aputure announced a global filmmaking competition, Light This Location, with RED Digital Cinema challenging participants to create a short film in a single location. Prizes varied from $250,000 to a million dollars in equipment equivalent prizes. The contest had over a thousand unique entries every year and features celebrity filmmaker judges such as Ryan Connolly, Philip Bloom, and Corridor Digital.
