= Iliac fossa =

Indentation on the hipbone

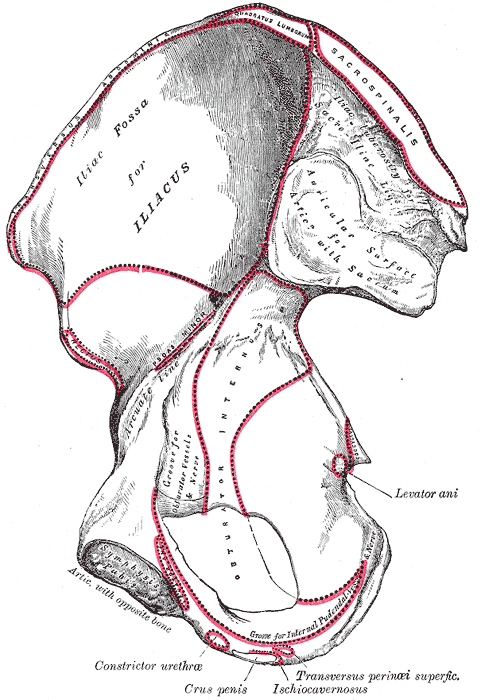
- Right hip bone. Internal surface. (Iliac fossa visible at upper left.)

- Pelvic girdle. (Region of iliac fossa visible at tip of arrow pointing from the word "Ilium".)

Details

Identifiers
- Latin: fossa iliaca
- TA98: A02.5.01.115
- TA2: 1331
- FMA: 75316

The iliac fossa is a large, smooth, concave surface on the internal surface of the ilium (part of the three fused bones making the hip bone).

== Structure ==
The iliac fossa is bounded above by the iliac crest, and below by the arcuate line. It is bordered in front and behind by the anterior and posterior borders of the ilium.

The iliac fossa gives origin to the iliacus muscle. The obturator nerve passes around the iliac fossa. It is perforated at its inner part by a nutrient canal. Below it there is a smooth, rounded border, the arcuate line, which runs anterior, inferior, and medial.

The iliac fossae are located in the right and left lower quadrants of the abdomen.

== Clinical significance ==
Pain felt in the iliac fossa regions are referred to as either right iliac fossa pain or left iliac fossa pain. Right iliac fossa pain is often due to appendicitis. In women some causes of left iliac fossa pain are an ectopic pregnancy, and pelvic inflammatory disease. In boys and young males left iliac fossa pain (or right iliac fossa pain) may indicate testicular torsion.

== Additional images ==
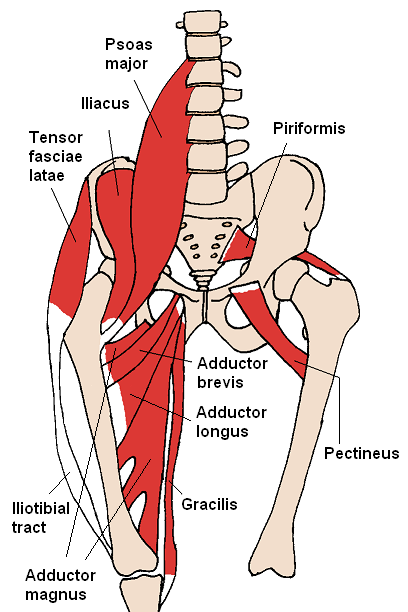
The iliacus and nearby muscles

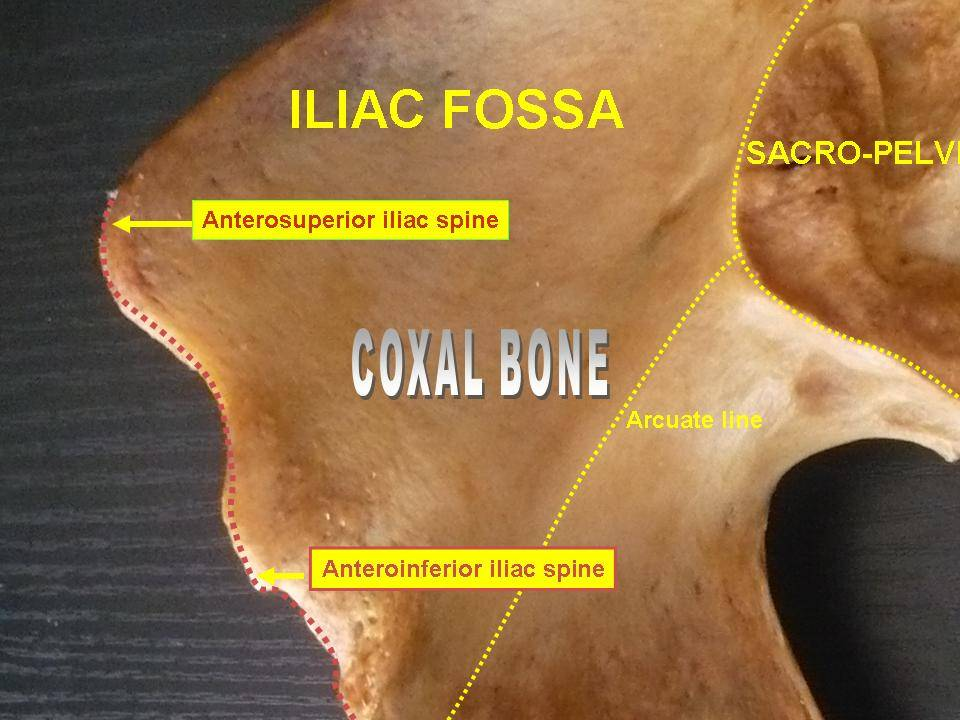
Iliac fossa

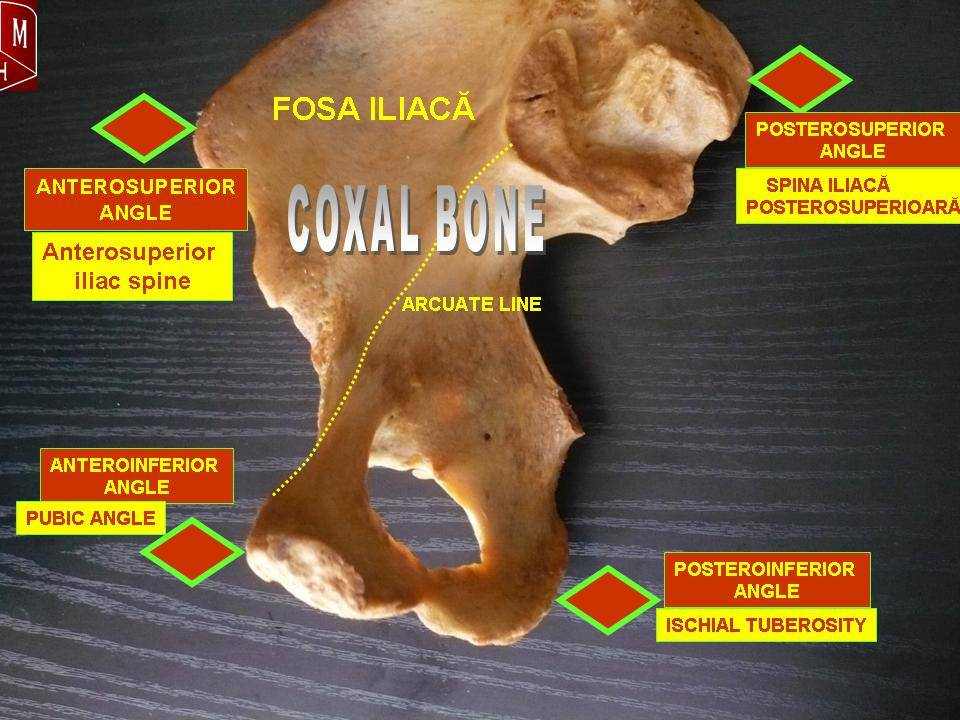
Iliac fossa

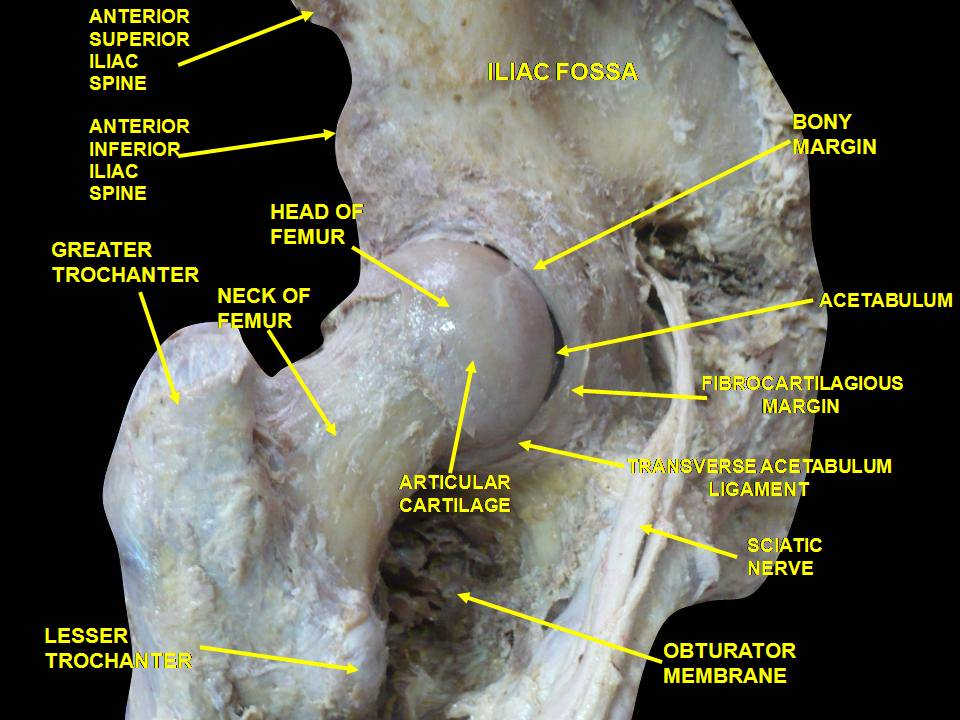
Hip joint. Lateral view. Iliac fossa.

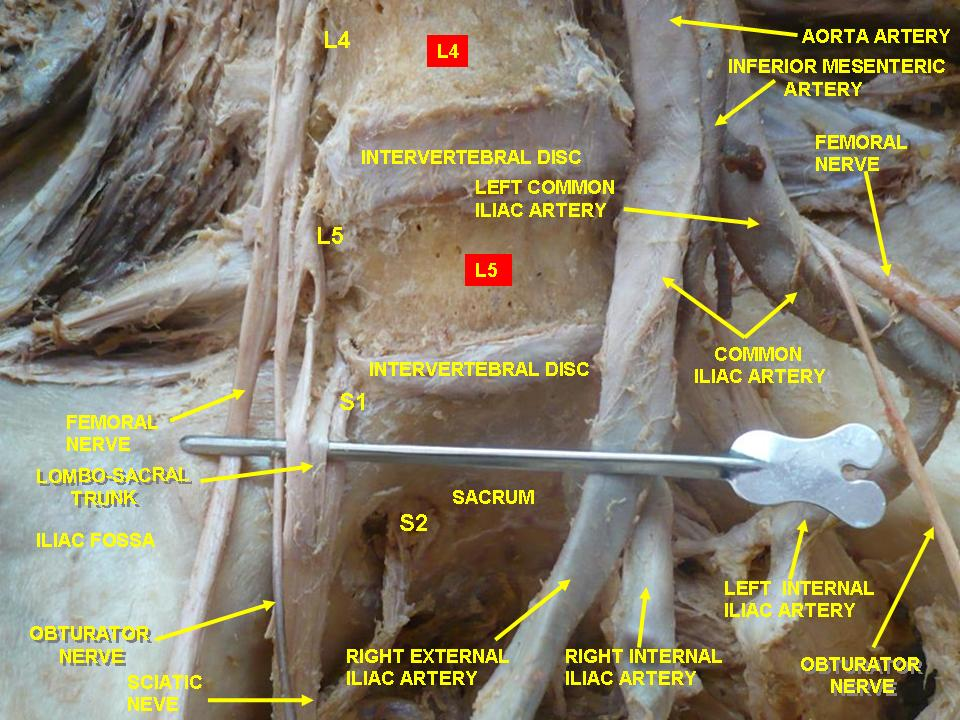
Lumbar and sacral plexus. Deep dissection. Anterior view

== See also ==
- Right iliac fossa
