= Iliopectineal line =

Anatomical structure on the pelvic bones

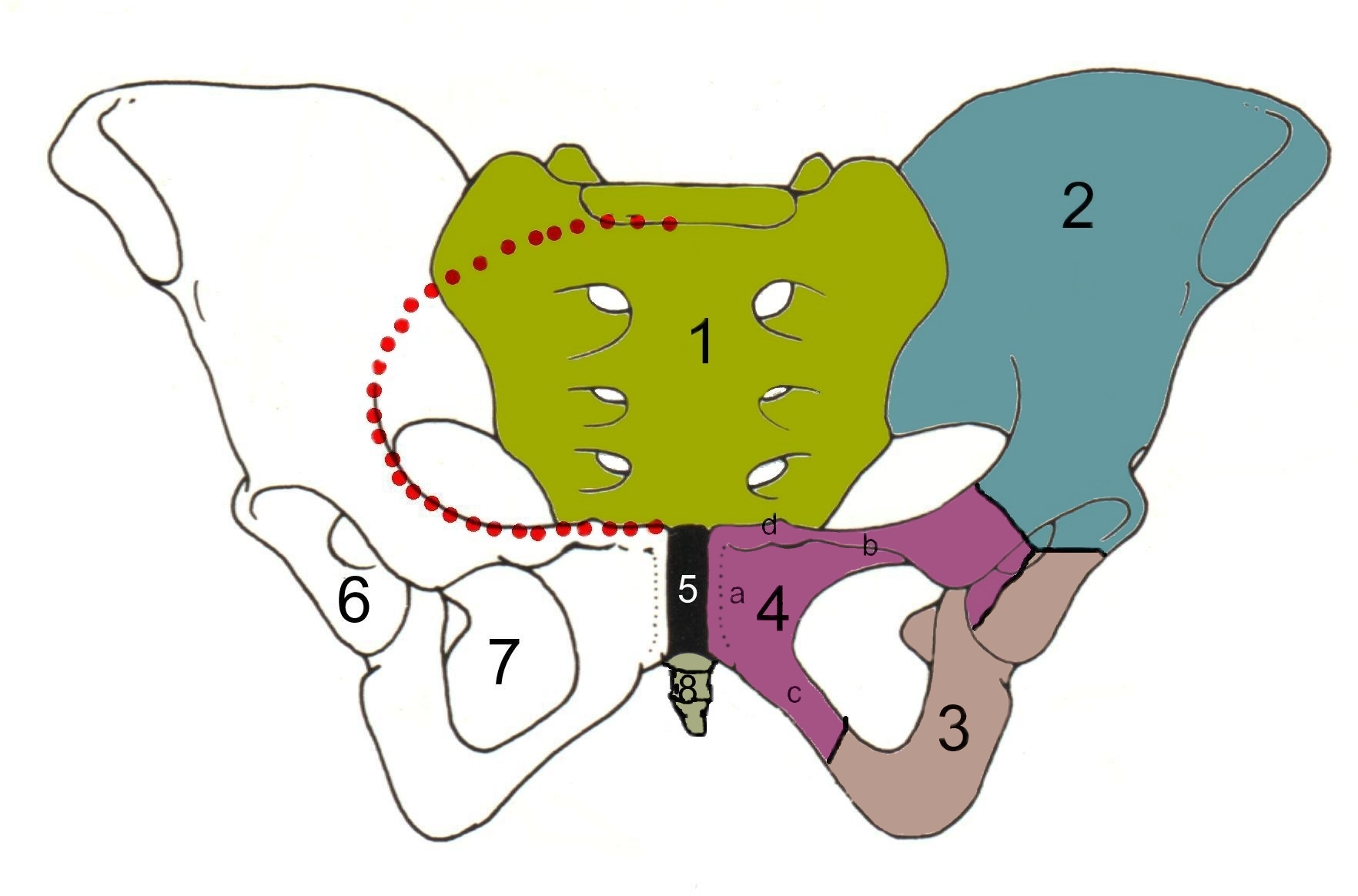
Diagram of the human pelvis. The red dotted line indicates the linea terminalis

The iliopectineal line is the border of the iliopubic eminence. It can be defined as a compound structure of the arcuate line (from the ilium) and pectineal line (from the pubis). With the sacral promontory, it makes up the linea terminalis.

The Iliopectineal line divides the pelvis into the pelvis major (false pelvis) above and the pelvis minor (true pelvis) below.
