= Aperture (botany) =

Areas on the walls of a pollen grain, where the wall is thinner and/or softer

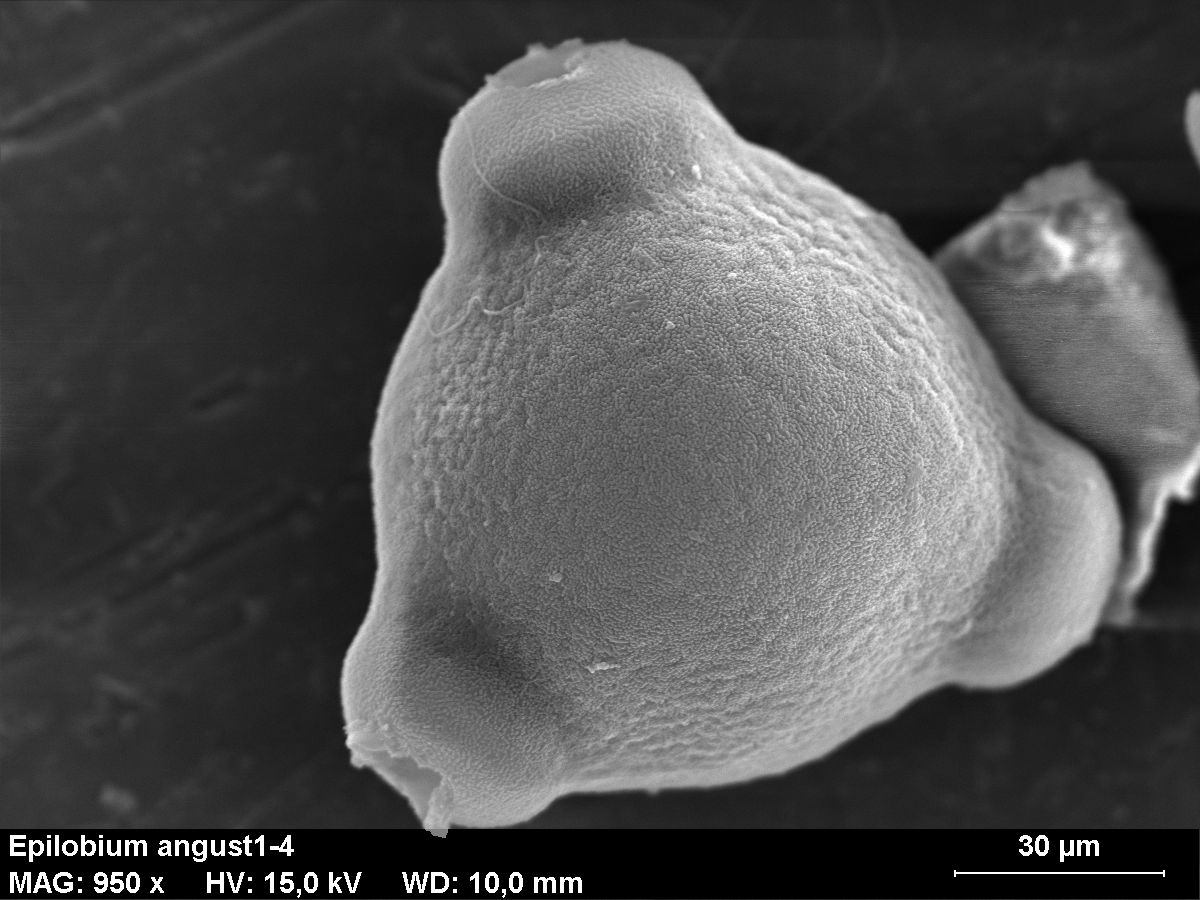
Epilobium pollen has three apertures that are pores

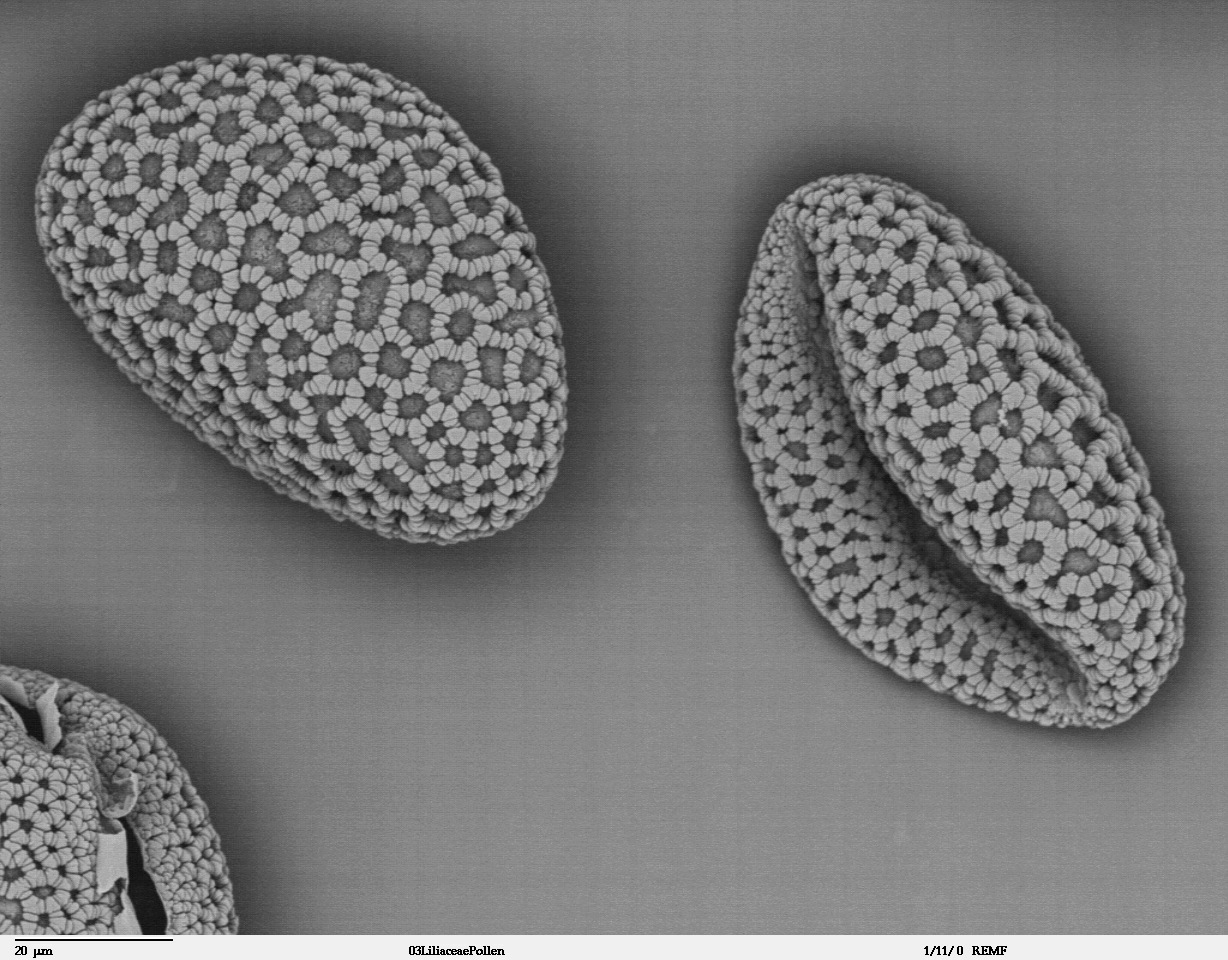
The aperture of Lilium pollen is a single sulcus

Apertures are thin, soft spots on pollen grain walls. When pollen germinates, a tube grows out through these weak spots to carry sperm cells to the egg inside the flower. The apertures are the places where the pollen tube is able to break through the (elsewhere very tough) pollen wall.

The number and configuration of apertures are often very exactly characteristic of different groups of plants. In gymnosperms (cone-bearing plants like pines), pollen typically has one groove-like aperture called a sulcus. Most flowering plants (a group called eudicots, which includes roses, sunflowers, and oak trees) have three furrow-like apertures called colpi that run from one side of the pollen grain to the other, creating what is called tricolpate pollen.

== Development and genetic control ==
As pollen develops (a process called microsporogenesis), the cell membrane forms distinct regions that attach to the surrounding cell wall because these domains are excluded from primexine deposition (the laying down of an early wall material), they later receive little or no sporopollenin (an extremely tough, protective coating) and emerge on the mature grain as apertures. These regions do not receive the tough protective sporopollenin coating, so they remain as soft spots—the apertures.

Comparative surveys show that the position and number of these domains vary greatly among seed plants. Most gymnosperms, monocots and early-diverging angiosperms have a single distal sulcus or pore, whereas the typical eudicot condition is tricolpate, with three equidistant furrows centred on the equator; other lineages show derived states ranging from two ring-like syncolpate apertures to pantoaperturate grains with a dozen or more pores distributed over the entire surface.

Scientists have discovered that creating these 'escape hatches' is complex, involving several genes working in sequence. Genetic work with the model plant Arabidopsis thaliana shows that just a few genes act in sequence to decide where each "weak spot" in the wall will go. When the gene INAPERTURATE POLLEN 1 (INP1) is knocked out, pollen grains form with no apertures at all even though the rest of the wall looks normal. D6PKL3, a protein kinase gene, then marks the exact spots on the cell surface that are destined to stay soft; reduced D6PKL3 activity leaves apertures partly formed or in the wrong place. Two more genes, whimsically named MACARON (MCR) and DOUGHNUT (DNT) because of how they shape the apertures—control how many apertures appear and their outline, suggesting that they provide the very first positional cues. Finally, experiments that double the chromosome set (ploidy) reveal that cells "count" their DNA and make more apertures when the genome is larger. Together the results point to a three-step process: MCR and DNT lay down positional markers, D6PKL3 reinforces those markers so they stay distinct, and INP1 keeps each marked patch soft, leaving a window through which the pollen tube can later emerge.

== Inaperturate pollen ==
Although most seed‐plant grains possess clearly delimited pores or furrows, many eudicot lineages produce inaperturate pollen in which those specialised exit points are absent or masked. A recent survey divided such grains into two broad classes. Some plants make pollen without any openings at all—but this 'dummy' pollen is not meant for reproduction. Instead, it serves as colourful decoration or food to attract pollinators. Fertile inaperturate grains, by contrast, have arisen repeatedly—usually in only a few taxa at a time, but reaching about 1500 species in the petal-bearing crotonoid subfamily of the Euphorbiaceae (spurge family) and roughly 2500 species in the pollen-producing subfamilies Secamonoideae and Asclepiadoideae of Apocynaceae. Fertile inaperturate grains typically carry a very thin or locally reduced exine; in "cryptoaperturate" forms the underlying endexine is thinned while the ectexine forms an unbroken protective lid. Ecological links are diverse: aperture loss has been correlated with aquatic or parasitic habits, carnivorous traps (Nepenthes), heterostyly, wind pollination in Populus, and the evolution of tightly packaged pollinia.

Developmental studies show that inaperturate grains follow the normal simultaneous microsporogenesis of eudicots, the cellular structures that normally prevent tough coating from forming at aperture sites do not develop. As a result, primexine—and later sporopollenin—is laid down evenly over the entire microspore surface, producing a uniform wall through which the pollen tube can force its way at any suitably thin point. Genetic work suggests this pattern depends on the same DEX1‐mediated primexine assembly pathway known from Arabidopsis, only deployed without the positional cues that would otherwise create discrete "weak spots". Consequently, inaperturate grains tend to be spheroidal and tolerably elastic: expansion during hydration is accommodated by the flexible intine and by thinner regions between exine elements rather than by pre-formed apertures.
