= Arcuate line of ilium =

Rounded edge on the coxal bone in the pelvis

Arcuate line (ilium)
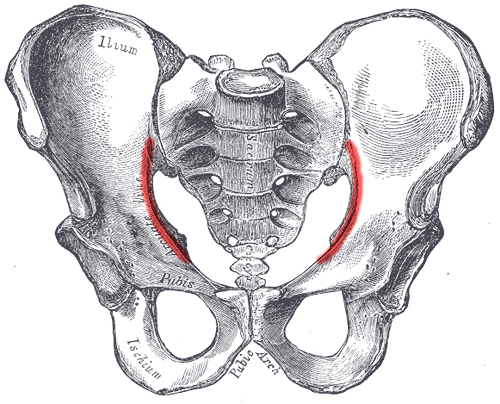
- Male pelvis. (Arcuate line shown in red.)

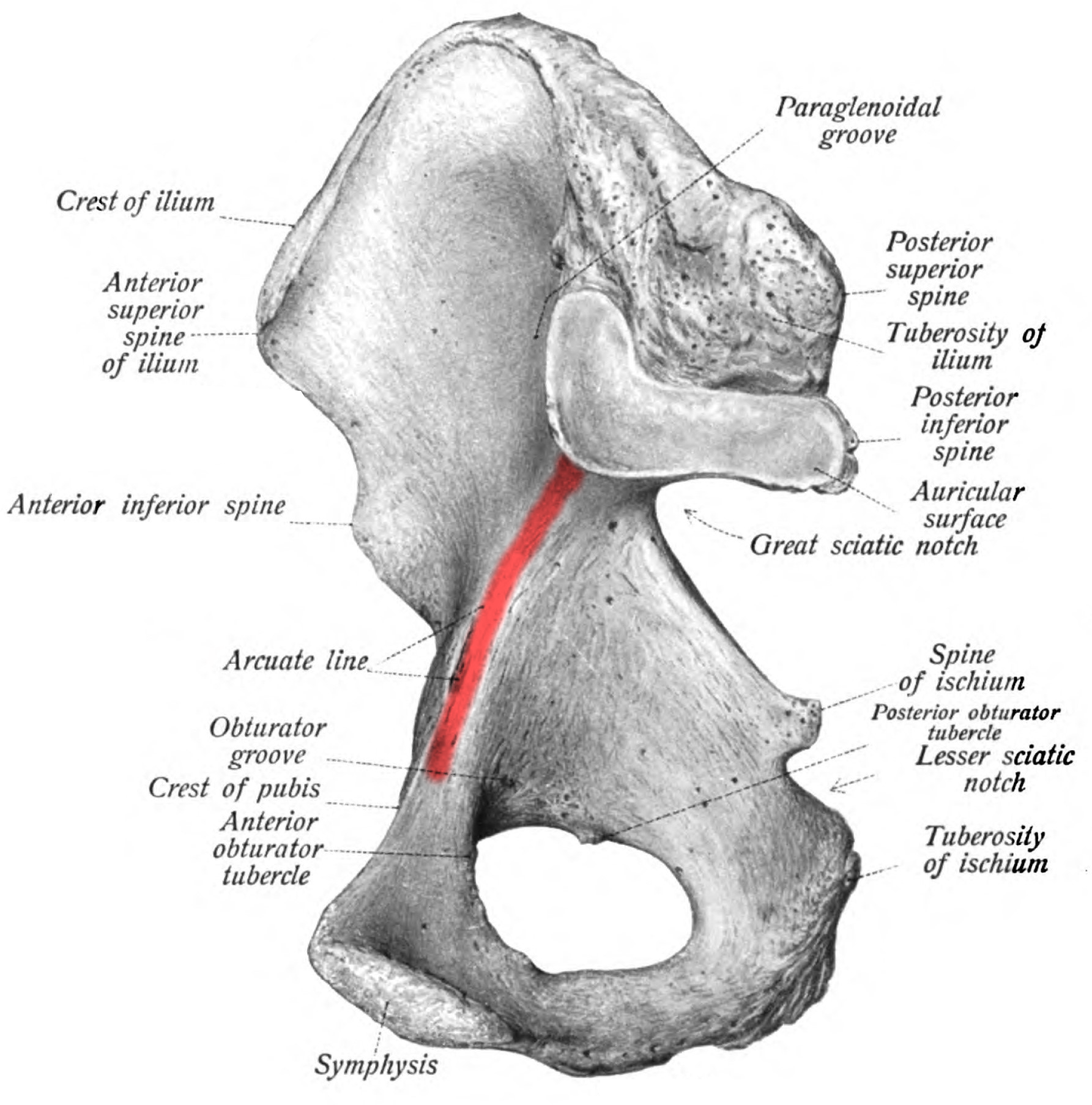
- Right hip bone. Internal surface. (Arcuate line visible shown in red.)

Details

Identifiers
- Latin: linea arcuata ossis ilii
- TA98: A02.5.01.105
- TA2: 1320
- FMA: 75088

The arcuate line of the ilium is a smooth rounded border on the internal surface of the ilium. It is immediately inferior to the iliac fossa and Iliacus muscle.

It forms part of the border of the pelvic inlet.

In combination with the pectineal line, it comprises the iliopectineal line.

The arcuate line marks the border between the body (corpus) and the wing (ala) of the ilium, and, running inferior, anterior, and medial from the auricular surface to the area corresponding to the acetabulum, it also indicates where weight is transferred from the sacroiliac joint to the hip joint.

== Additional images ==
Position of arcuate line of ilium. Shown in red.

Close up

Pelvis with the iliopectineal line indicated in red
