= Iliacus muscle =

Flat, triangular muscle which fills the iliac fossa

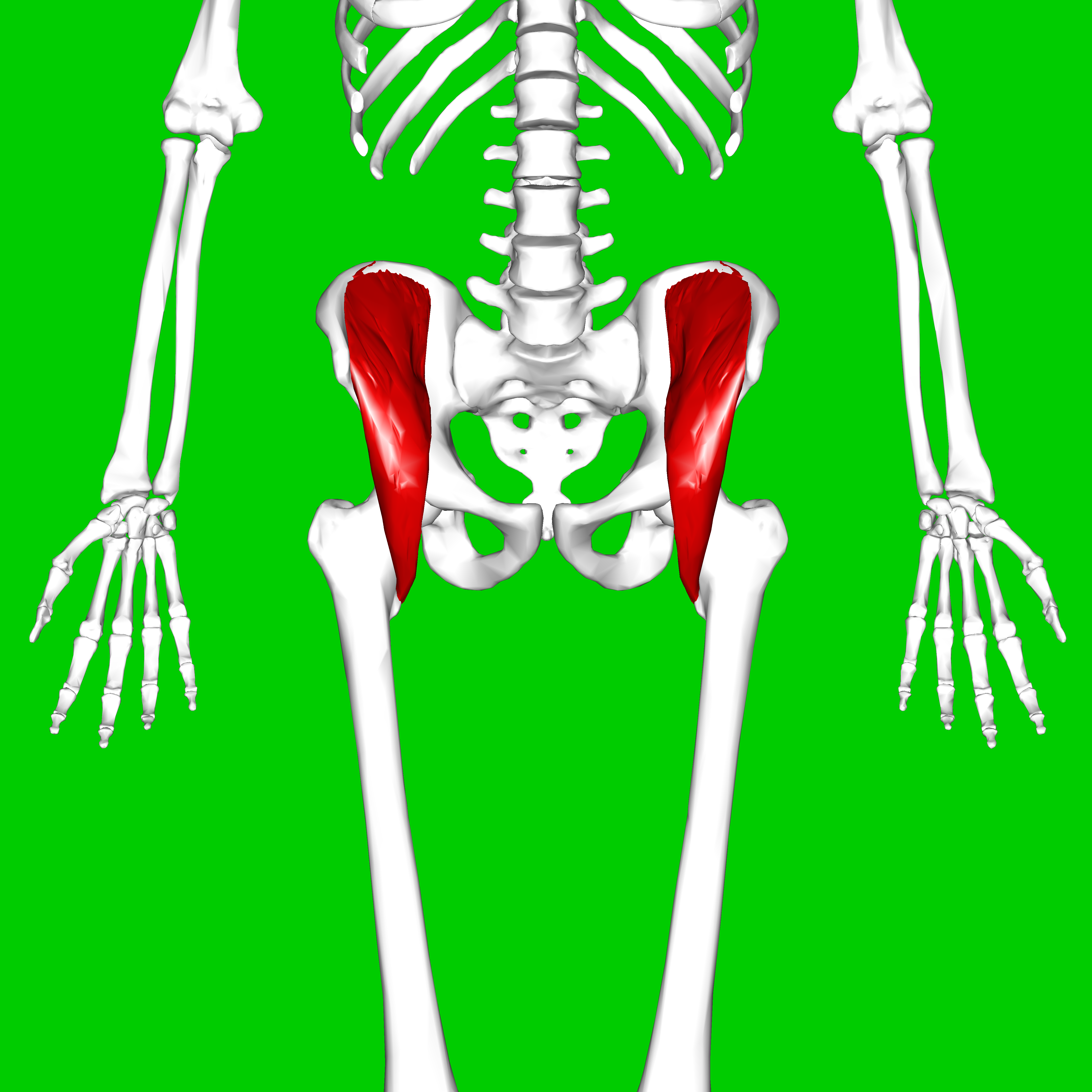
- Position of iliacus muscle (shown in red)

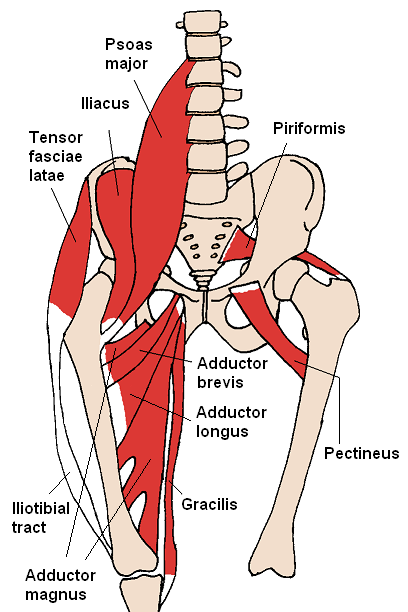
- The iliacus and nearby muscles

Details
- Pronunciation: /ɪˈlaɪ.əkəs/
- Origin: Upper two-thirds of the iliac fossa
- Insertion: Base of the lesser trochanter of femur
- Artery: Medial femoral circumflex artery, iliac branch of iliolumbar artery
- Nerve: Femoral nerve
- Actions: Flexes and rotates medially thigh
- Antagonist: Gluteus maximus

Identifiers
- Latin: musculus iliacus
- TA98: A04.7.02.003
- TA2: 2594
- FMA: 22310

The iliacus is a flat, triangular muscle which fills the iliac fossa. It forms the lateral portion of iliopsoas, providing flexion of the thigh and lower limb at the acetabulofemoral joint.

== Structure ==
The iliacus arises from the iliac fossa on the interior side of the hip bone, and also from the region of the anterior inferior iliac spine (AIIS). It joins the psoas major to form the iliopsoas. It proceeds across the iliopubic eminence through the muscular lacuna to its insertion on the lesser trochanter of the femur. Its fibers are often inserted in front of those of the psoas major and extend distally over the lesser trochanter.

=== Nerve supply ===
The iliopsoas is innervated by the femoral nerve and direct branches from the lumbar plexus.

== Function ==
In open-chain exercises, as part of the iliopsoas, the iliacus is important for lifting (flexing) the femur forward (e.g. front scale). In closed-chain exercises, the iliopsoas bends the trunk forward and can lift the trunk from a lying posture (e.g. sit-ups, back scale) because the psoas major crosses several vertebral joints and the sacroiliac joint. From its origin in the lesser pelvis the iliacus acts exclusively on the hip joint.

== Additional images ==
Position of iliacus muscle (shown in red). Animation.

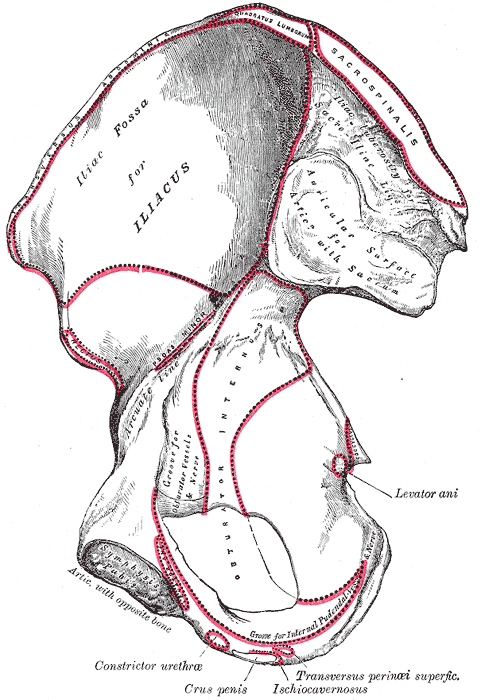
Right hip bone. Internal surface. Iliac fossa visible at upper left.
