= Pelvic inlet =

Plane representing the boundary between the pelvic and abdominal cavities

- The pelvic inlet (shown in red)

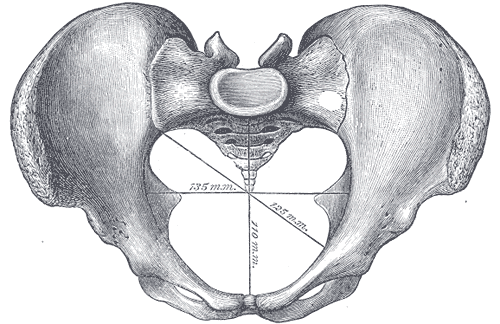
- Diameters of superior aperture of lesser pelvis (female)

Details

Identifiers
- Latin: apertura pelvis superior
- TA98: A02.5.02.008
- TA2: 1289
- FMA: 17272

The pelvic inlet or superior aperture of the pelvis is a planar surface which defines the boundary between the pelvic cavity and the abdominal cavity (or, according to some authors, between two parts of the pelvic cavity, called lesser pelvis and greater pelvis). It is a major target of measurements of pelvimetry.

Its position and orientation relative to the skeleton of the pelvis is anatomically defined by its edge, the pelvic brim. The pelvic brim is an approximately apple-shaped line passing through the prominence of the sacrum, the arcuate and pectineal lines, and the upper margin of the pubic symphysis.

Occasionally, the terms pelvic inlet and pelvic brim are used interchangeably.

== Boundaries ==
The edge of the pelvic inlet (pelvic brim) is formed as follows:

	Anteriorly by the pubic crest (or pubic symphysis)	
Laterally by the iliopectineal line		(same as other side)
	Posteriorly by the anterior margin of the base of the sacrum (or the ala of sacrum) and sacrovertebral angle (or sacral promontory)	

== Diameters ==
The diameters or conjugates of the pelvis are measured at the pelvic inlet and outlet and as oblique diameters.

Name	Description	Average measurement in female
Anteroposterior or conjugate diameter or conjugata vera	Extends from the upper margin of the pubic symphysis to the sacrococcygeal joint;	about 110 mm.
Transverse diameter	Extends across the greatest width of the superior aperture, from the middle of the brim on one side to the same point on the opposite;	about 135 mm.
Oblique diameter	Extends from the iliopectineal eminence of one side to the sacroiliac articulation of the opposite side;	about 125 mm.
Anatomical conjugate	Extends from the pubic symphysis to the promontory;	about 120 mm.
Diagonal conjugate	Extends from lower margin of the pubic symphysis to the sacral promontory;	about 130 mm.
Straight conjugate	Extends from the lower border of the pubic symphysis to the tip of coccyx. The coccyx can bend posteriorly and expand the diameter with 25 mm;	about 95 mm (+ 25 mm).
Median conjugate	Extends from the lower border of the pubic symphysis to the lower border of the sacrum;	about 115 mm.

Two diameters may be measured from the outside of the body using a pelvimeter

Name	Description	Average measurement in female
Iilac interspinous distance (Different from interspinous distance that is measured between the ischial spines)	Extends between the anterior superior iliac spines;	about 260 mm.
Intercristal distance	Extends between the furthest later points of the two iliac crests;	about 290 mm.

== Additional images ==
Pelvis

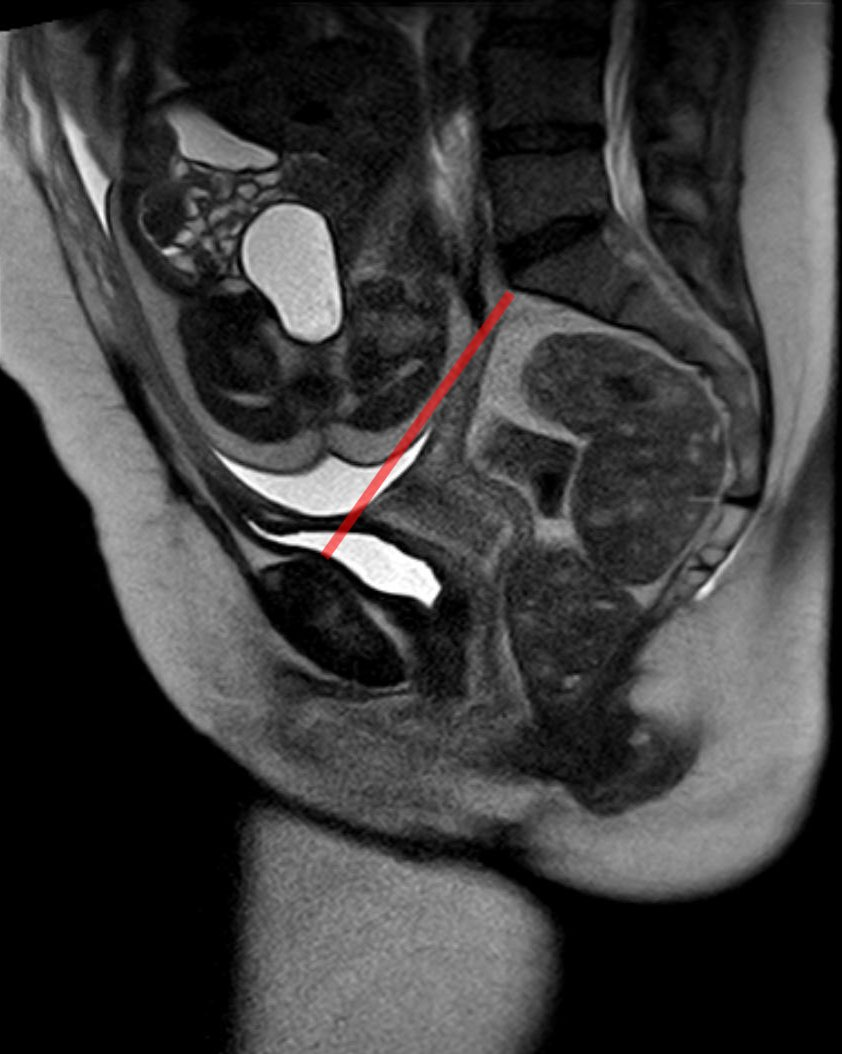
Conjugata vera as measured on sagittal MRI

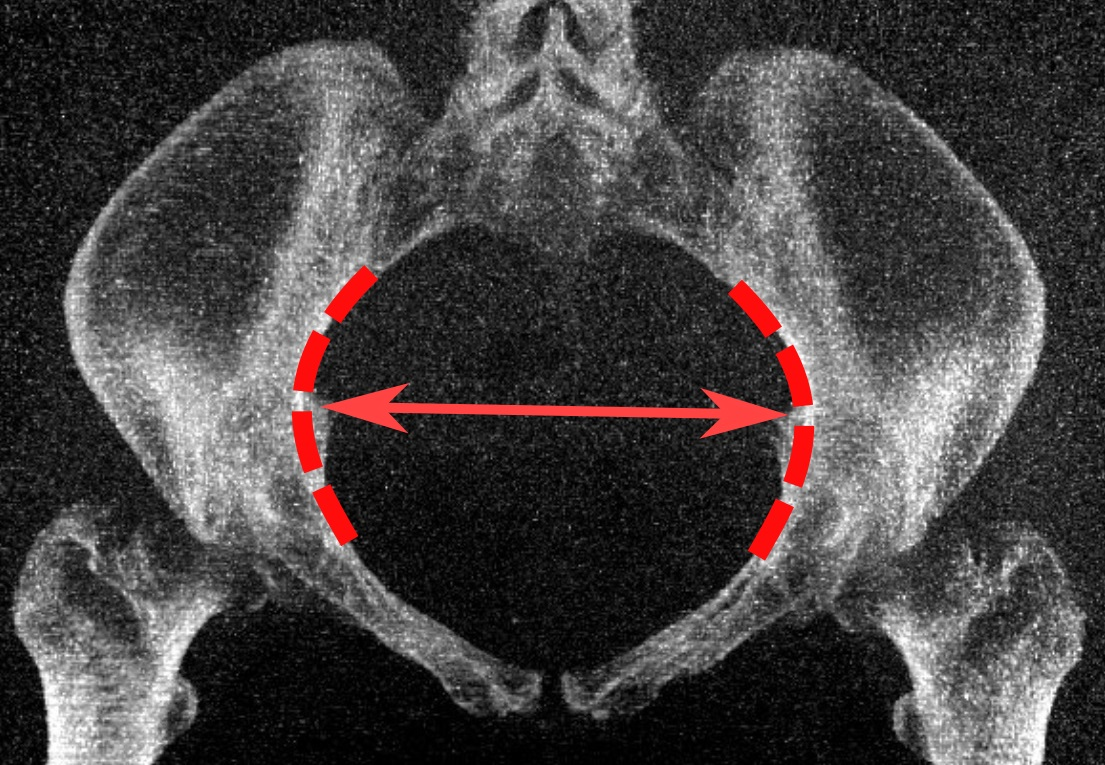
Low-dose CT scan of the transverse diameter of the pelvic inlet, as part of pelvimetry

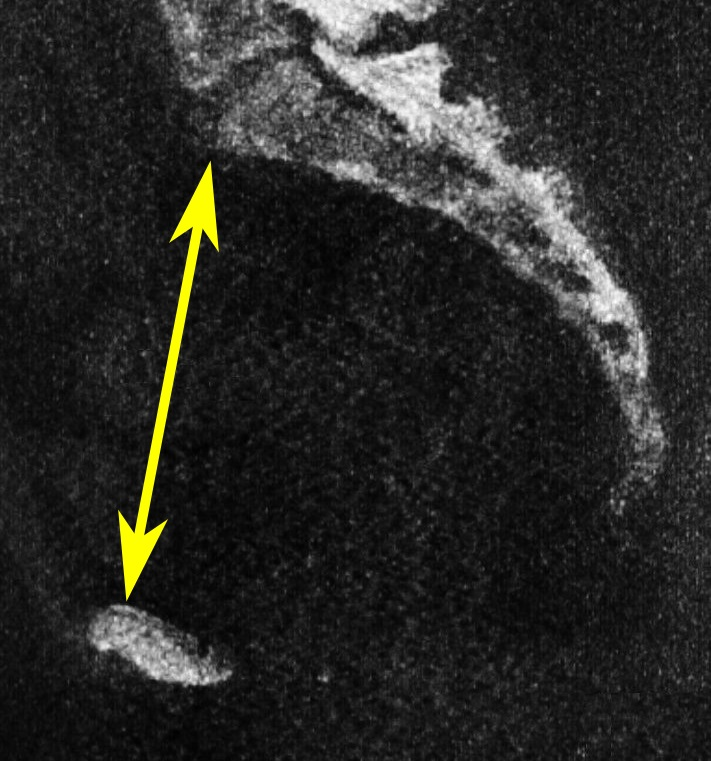
Obstetric conjugate, as a measure of the pelvic inlet in the sagittal plane

== See also ==
- Pelvic outlet
