= Pectineal line (pubis) =

Ridge on the pubis where pectineus muscle inserts

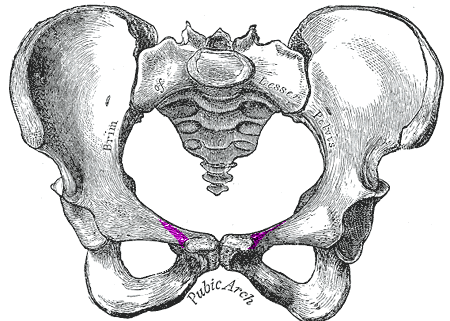
- Female pelvis. Pectineal line in purple slightly lateral to midline of bottom of central opening.

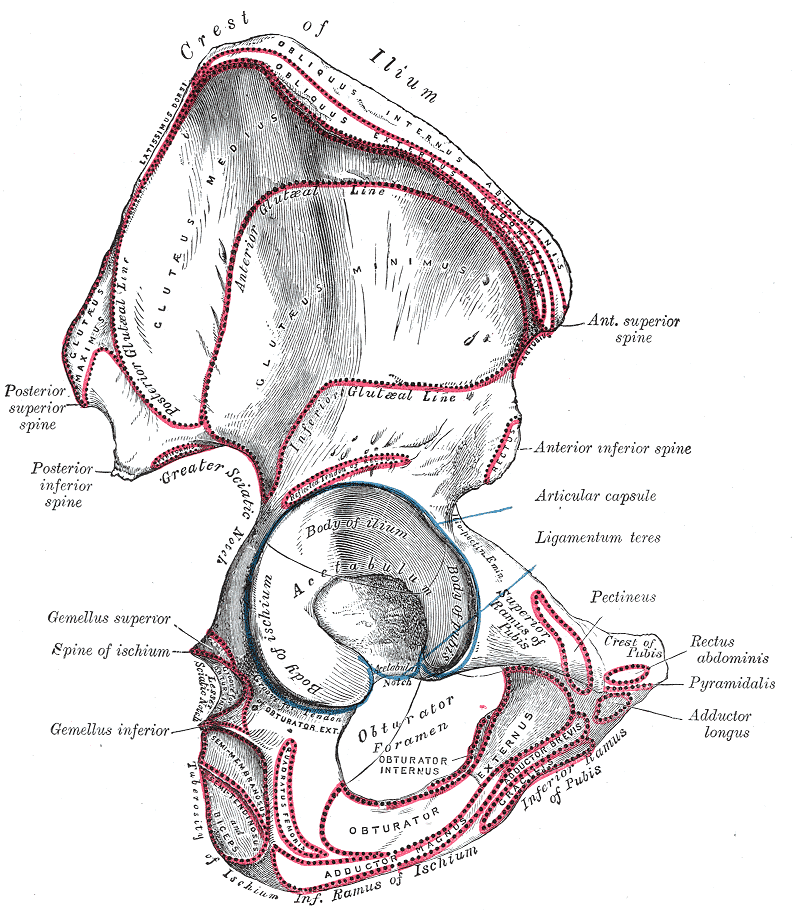
- Right hip bone. External surface., with pectineal line corresponding to the "Pectineus" area demarcated in red at right.

Details

Identifiers
- Latin: linea pectinea ossis pubis, pecten ossis pubis
- TA98: A02.5.01.308
- TA2: 1353
- FMA: 16979

The pectineal line of the pubis (also pecten pubis) is a ridge on the superior ramus of the pubic bone. It forms part of the pelvic brim.

Lying across from the pectineal line are fibers of the pectineal ligament, and the proximal origin of the pectineus muscle.

In combination with the arcuate line, it makes the iliopectineal line.
