= Sacrococcygeal =

Sacrococcygeal can refer to:

- Sacrococcygeal teratoma
- Anterior sacrococcygeal ligament
- Posterior sacrococcygeal ligament
- Sacrococcygeal symphysis
- Sacrococcygeal membrane
