= Sacrococcygeal ligament =

Sacrococcygeal ligament can refer to:

- Anterior sacrococcygeal ligament (ligamentum sacrococcygeum anterius)
- Lateral sacrococcygeal ligament (ligamentum sacrococcygeum laterale)
- Posterior sacrococcygeal ligament (ligamentum sacrococcygeum posterius)
  - Deep posterior of the sacrococcygeal ligament (ligamentum sacrococcygeum posterius profundum)
  - Superior part of the posterior sacrococcygeal ligament (ligamentum sacrococcygeum posterius superficiale)
