= Coccyx fracture =

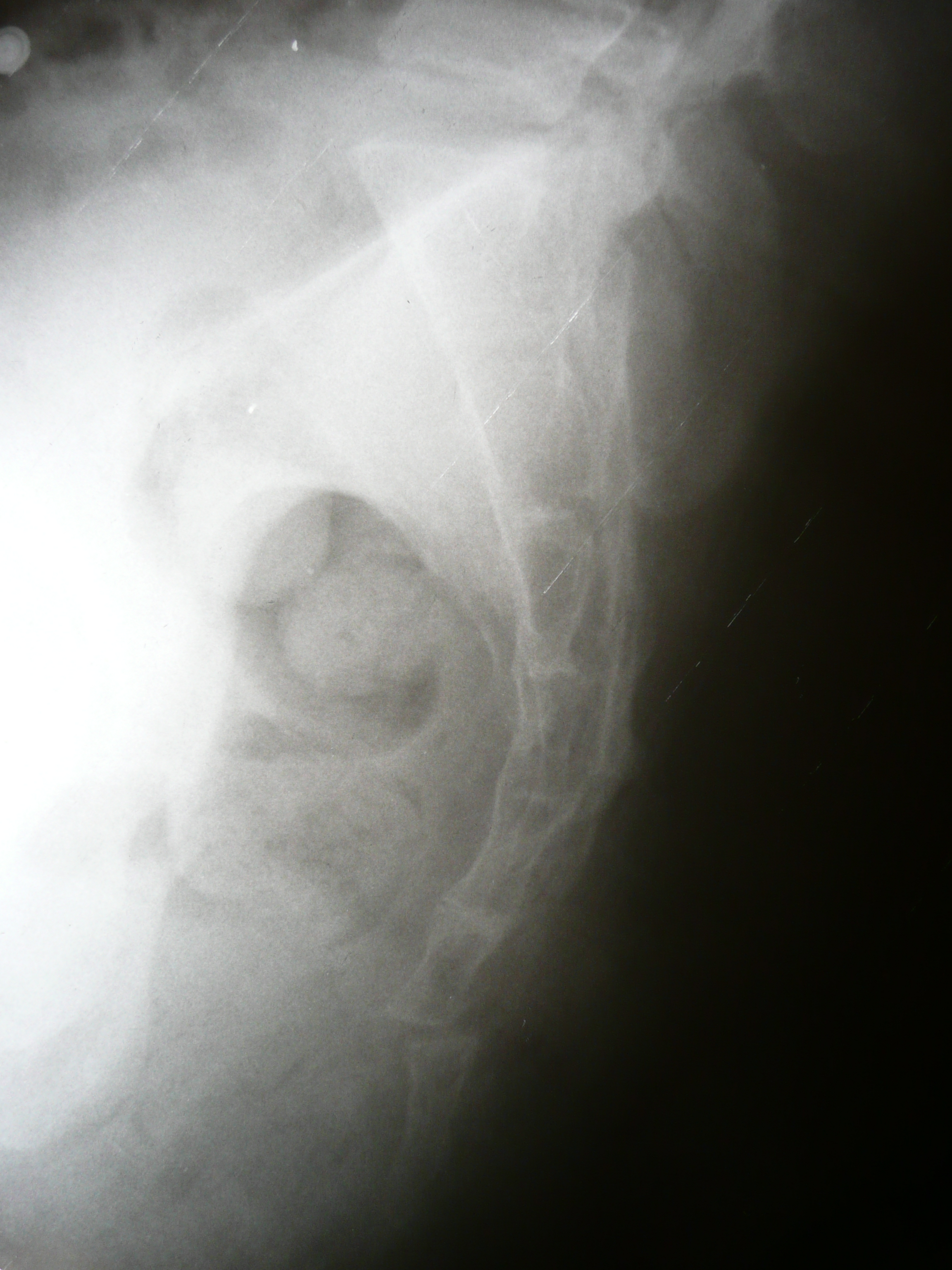
- Lateral radiograph showing a fracture of the coccyx, as well as a lower lumbar fracture
- Specialty: Orthopedic

A coccyx fracture is a fracture of the coccyx, commonly called a broken tailbone or ‘puzzle fracture.’

The coccyx is located at the base of the spine, under the sacrum. It is the last section of the ape vertebral column. Most commonly in humans it comprises 3 to 5 fused (or, more rarely, separate) vertebrae, and is approximately 4 to 10 cm in length. The coccyx is attached to the sacrum by a fibrocartilaginous joint, called the sacrococcygeal symphysis, allowing for some (but little) movement.

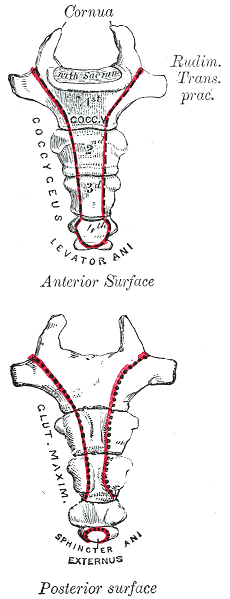
Anatomical diagram of a healthy coccyx

== Causes ==
Causes of coccyx fracture can vary greatly, but are most commonly confined to falls into the seated position, or childbirth.

== Risk factors ==
The following risk factors have been identified for coccyx fracture:

- Lack of/reduced muscle mass
- Advanced age
- Osteoporosis
- Being of the female sex (due to the wider pelvis typically found in females)
- Violence

Symptoms of coccyx fracture include:

- Pain that increases in severity when sitting or getting up from a chair, or when experiencing bowel movement
- Provoked pain over the tailbone
- Nausea
- Bruising or swelling in the tailbone area

== Diagnosis ==
The standard workup of a suspected coccyx fracture includes medical history and a physical examination including a rectal examination.

X-ray has no quantifiable clinical impact, and is regarded as a waste of resources and unnecessary exposure to ionizing radiation.

== Treatment ==
If the coccyx fracture is severe enough, short-term hospitalisation may be required, although this is extremely rare. More often, self-care at home is administered.

Sitting on soft surfaces is recommended, as this reduces pressure on the coccyx. A 'donut' or 'wedge' cushion may be purchased – these are simply cushions with a hole in them to ensure that no weight is placed on the injured tailbone. Painkillers such as ibuprofen are also recommended, as is a diet high in fibre to soften stools and avoid constipation.

Doctors will not usually attempt to correct a bad alignment, as muscles in the area are powerful and can pull the bone back into the 'original' position. The bone is also very difficult to immobilise simply due to the sheer number of muscles attached to it, as well as the position.

=== Surgery ===
Following a coccyx fracture, surgery is not usually required. However, if the pain continues even after the fracture has healed, and is severe enough to cause serious disability, surgical removal of the coccyx (coccygectomy) may be required.

== See also ==
- Sacral fracture (rarer)
