= Iliolumbar =

Iliolumbar can refer to:

- Iliolumbar artery
- Iliolumbar vein
- Iliolumbar ligament
