= Lumbosacral ligament =

Ligament of the spine

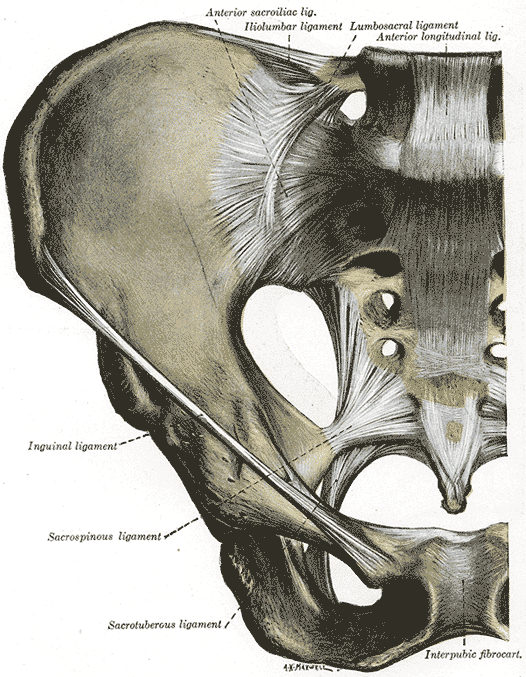
- Articulations of pelvis, anterior view (lumbosacral ligament labeled at center top).

Details

Identifiers
- Latin: ligamentum lumbosacrale

The lumbosacral ligament or lateral lumbosacral ligament is a ligament that helps to stabilise the lumbosacral joint. The ligament's medial attachment is at (the inferior border of) transverse process of lumbar vertebra L5; its lateral attachment is at the ala of sacrum.

The lumbosacral ligament extends obliquely inferior-ward from its medial attachment. Superiorly, it is partially continuous with the inferior margin of the iliolumbar ligament (the lumbosarcal ligament can be considered an inferior subdivision of the iliolumbar ligament).

== Research ==
According to a cadaveric study, the lumbosacral ligament forms a roof of a lumbosacral tunnel which is traversed by the (ipsilateral) lumbar spinal nerve L5; the tunnel may be the site of extraforaminal nerve entrapment due to mass effect of local pathologies.
