= Sacrococcygeal symphysis =

Joint in the pelvis

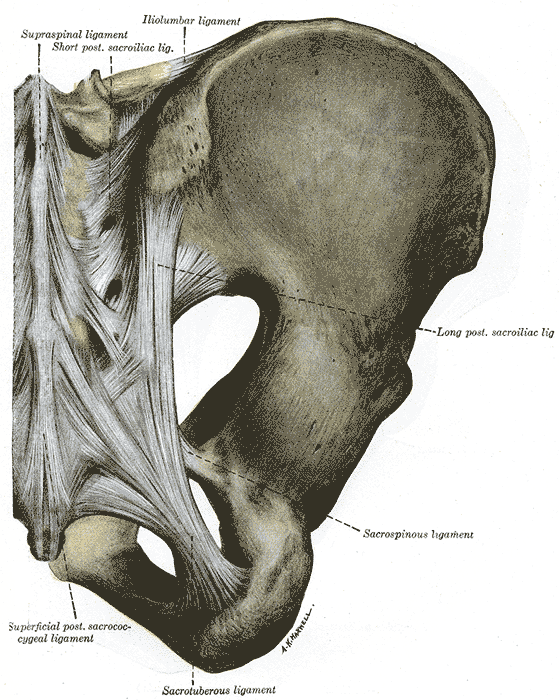
- Articulations of pelvis. Posterior view.

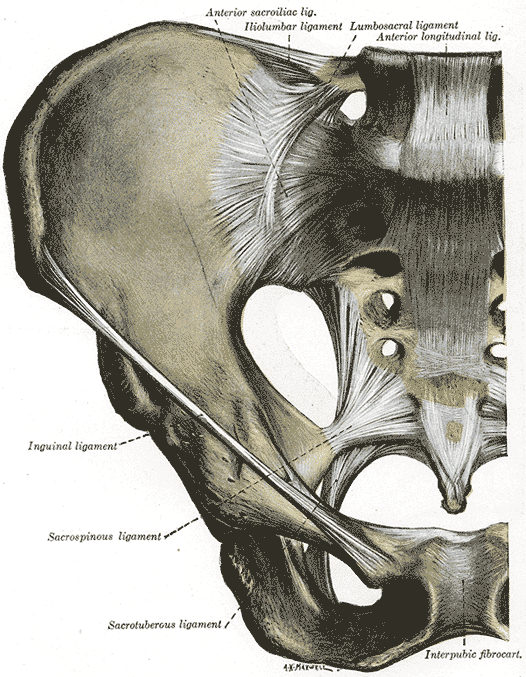
- Anterior view.

Details

Identifiers
- Latin: articulatio sacrococcygea, symphysis sacrococcygea
- TA98: A03.2.08.001
- TA2: 1688
- FMA: 16210

The sacrococcygeal symphysis (sacrococcygeal articulation, articulation of the sacrum and coccyx) is an amphiarthrodial joint, formed between the oval surface at the apex of the sacrum, and the base of the coccyx.

It is a slightly moveable joint which is frequently, partially or completely, obliterated in old age, homologous with the joints between the bodies of the vertebrae.

== Structure ==
=== Articular disc ===
The sacrococcygeal disc or interosseus ligament is similar to the intervertebral discs but thinner, thicker in front and behind than at the sides, and with a firmer texture. The articular surfaces are elliptical with longer transversal axes. The surface on the sacrum is convex and that on the coccyx concave. Occasionally the coccyx is freely movable on the sacrum, most notably during pregnancy; in such cases a synovial membrane is present.

=== Ligaments ===
The joint is strengthened by a series of ligaments:

- The ventral or anterior sacrococcygeal ligament is an extension of the anterior longitudinal ligament (ALL) that runs down along the spine on the anterior sides of the bodies of the vertebrae. It consists of a few irregular fibers that attach to the anterior sides of the sacrum and coccyx and blend with the periosteum.
- The dorsal or posterior sacrococcygeal ligament has a deep and a superficial part:
  - The deep dorsal ligament is a flat band which corresponds to the posterior longitudinal ligament (PLL) that run down inside the vertebral canal on the posterior surfaces of the bodies of the vertebrae. From the posterior side of the fifth sacral body inside the sacral canal, the dorsal ligament stretches to the posterior side of the coccyx, to attach deep to the superficial dorsal ligament.
  - The superficial dorsal ligament corresponds to the ligamenta flava and closes the posterior aspect of the distal end of the vertebral canal. It stretches from median sacral crest and the free margin of the sacral hiatus to the dorsal surface of the coccyx.
- The lateral sacrococcygeal ligaments run from the lower lateral angles of the sacrum to the transverse processes of the first coccygeal vertebra to complete the foramina for the last sacral nerve. Three lateral ligaments have been reported on either side.
- The interarticular or intercornual sacrococcygeal ligaments stretches from the cornu of the sacrum to the cornu of the coccyx.

== Function ==
Movements in the joint are restricted to flexion and extension. These essentially passive movements occurs during defecation and labour. When movements in the sacrum increase the anteroposterior diameter of the pelvic outlet, movements in the sacrococcygeal joint can further increase this diameter.

== Clinical significance ==
The joint is palpable deep within the natal cleft, and can be felt as a horizontal groove. With the palpating finger on the dorsal surface of the coccyx, a degree of rotation can be produced with an applied forward pressure.

== See also ==
- Anococcygeal raphé
- Coccydynia (coccyx pain, tailbone pain)
- Ganglion impar
- Rump (croup)
