= Lateral sacrococcygeal ligament =

Pair of ligaments in the human torso

Details
- From: Sacrum
- To: Coccyx

Identifiers
- Latin: ligamentum sacrococcygeum laterale
- TA98: A03.2.08.005
- TA2: 1692
- FMA: 21503

In the human body, the lateral sacrococcygeal ligament is a bilaterally paired ligament extending between the transverse process coccyx, and the inferolateral angle of the sacrum. The ligament forms a foramen for an anterior ramus of the fifth sacral nerve (S5). The ligament may become ossified. There may be up to three lateral sacrococcygeal ligaments on either side of the sacral hiatus.

== Function ==
Together with the anterior, posterior, and intercornual sacrococcygeal ligaments, the lateral sacrococcygeal ligaments stabilize the sacrococcygeal symphysis (i.e. the joint between the sacrum and the coccyx).

== See also ==
- Anterior sacrococcygeal ligament
- Posterior sacrococcygeal ligaments
