= Coccygotomy =

Coccygotomy is a surgical procedure which was used from 1859 to treat coccydynia (coccyx pain) which has failed to respond to nonsurgical treatment. Its inventor, James Young Simpson suggested that coccydynia was the result of forced movement of the joints of the coccyx when they were injured or inflamed. Severing the tendons and ligaments attached to the coccyx might therefore reduce such movement and relieve the pain.

== Surgical procedure ==
To perform the operation a long thin tenotomy knife is inserted near the tip of the coccyx, passed along the posterior aspect of the bone, and used to divide the muscular and tendinous attachments on both sides, and all round the tip of it. Simpson described coccygotomy as simple, easy and rapid compared to the more radical measure of coccygectomy. Skene, on the other hand, described coccygectomy as an easier operation for the surgeon, and added 'The subcutaneous operation, always difficult, is nearly impossible where the bone is covered with much adipose tissue'. Simpson did not use anesthesia, but some later surgeons did. The surgeon Richard Barwell introduced a modified version of the operation which in some cases included inserting the knife a little above the tip of the sacrum, and dividing the soft parts transversely down to the bone.

== Complications and risks ==
As with any operation under anesthetic, there are risks associated with general anesthesia itself. An additional possible complication of coccygotomy is infection at the surgical site, due to the site's proximity to the anus, which may lead to contamination by bacteria from the patient's feces, as has been found with coccygectomy.

== Success rates ==
There is little numerical information on success rates. Simpson reported that that coccygotomy was successful in almost every case, and in only a few cases did he need to follow up with coccygectomy. Barwell treated 23 patients with coccydynia, and used a modified form of coccygotomy on 17 of them, reporting that 16 were ‘quite recovered of the coccydynia’.

Use of coccygotomy was reported by many surgeons in the late 19th century and early 20th century, and has sometimes been used more recently as part of other procedures.
