= Sacrococcygeal membrane =

Tough fibrous membrane

The sacrococcygeal membrane is a tough fibrous membrane about 10mm long which extends from the inferior tip of the sacrum to the body of the coccyx in humans. It covers the inferior limit of the epidural space and is analogous to the ligamentum flavum found at other levels in the spine.

It can be found at the apex of an equilateral triangle whose base is formed by the dimples overlying the sacro-iliac joints. The cornua of the sacrum may be palpated with a finger; the sacrococcygeal membrane lies between and inferior to these.
