= Pelvis justo major =

Congenitally large female pelvis of normal shape

- Other names: Pelvis aequabiliter justo major; giant pelvis
- Specialty: Obstetrics

Pelvis justo major (also called giant pelvis) is a rare condition of the adult female pelvis where the pelvis flares above the iliopectineal line. It is 1.5 or more times larger than an average pelvis in every direction and is typically at least 42 cm (16.5 inches) in biiliac width. Even though this condition is classified as a congenital abnormality, it is not normally considered a medical disease of the pelvis as it typically holds a true gynecoid shape, only larger, without posing other major health risks except in childbirth.

Pregnant women with this condition, at the time of delivery, may have a precipitous birth. With a wider pelvis justo major, there is no pelvic bone "molding" of the fetal head as is typical for a normally sized pelvis, and as such there is virtually no resistance from the pelvis itself. As this allows for a much more rapid vaginal birth, there is an increased risk of tearing of the perineal soft tissues. At the time of delivery, the strong uterine contractions and maternal bearing down almost instantly overwhelm the integrity of a previously unstretched vaginal orifice. This is often the case if the women have not previously practiced vaginal stretching to the degree that allows such an instant birthing, especially so for a primiparous woman. This sudden or "instant delivery" problem leads many OBGYN doctors to stress the importance of women with a larger pelvis, especially those with Pelvis justo major, practicing pre-delivery vaginal stretching to avoid perineal injury.

Pelvis justo major is present in less than one in one thousand adult women, and a measurement scan or anthropometry by calipers is required to diagnose the condition. The incidence of pelvis justo major pelvis is not found to be a strictly standard deviation type variation, as it follows a tail-skewed deviation to the right. Pelvis justo major is classified as congenital and thought to be partially inherited, especially from the maternal side.
