= Sacral fracture =

Break in the sacrum bone

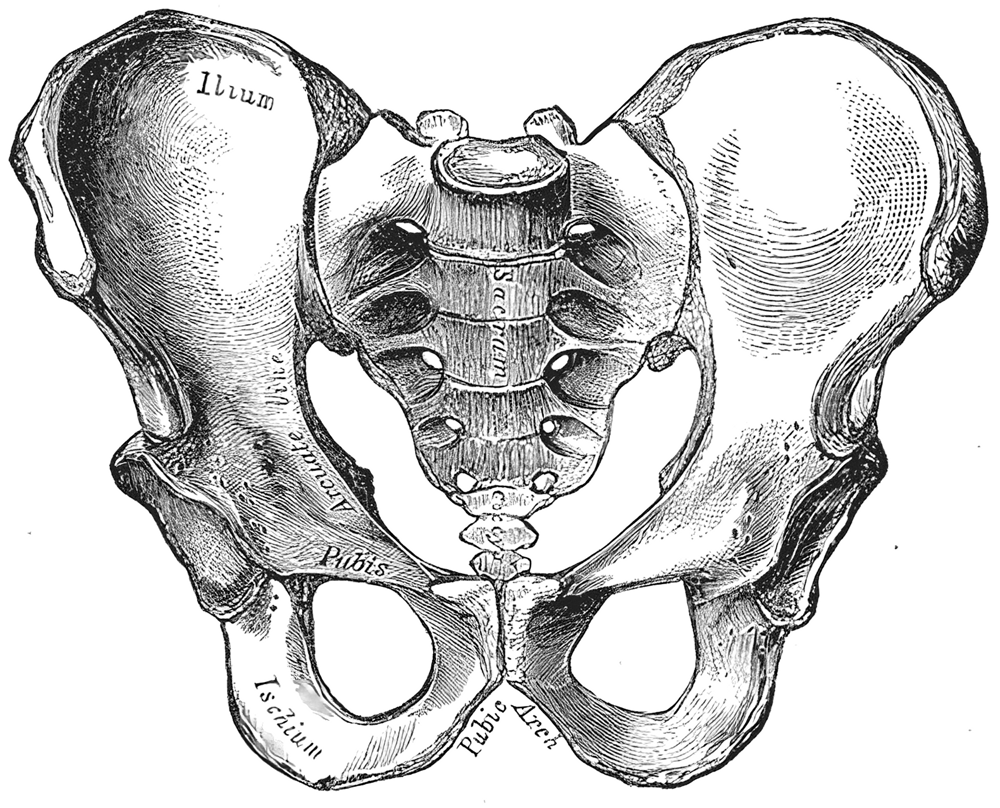
In this picture of the pelvis, the sacrum is the butterfly-shaped bone in the middle

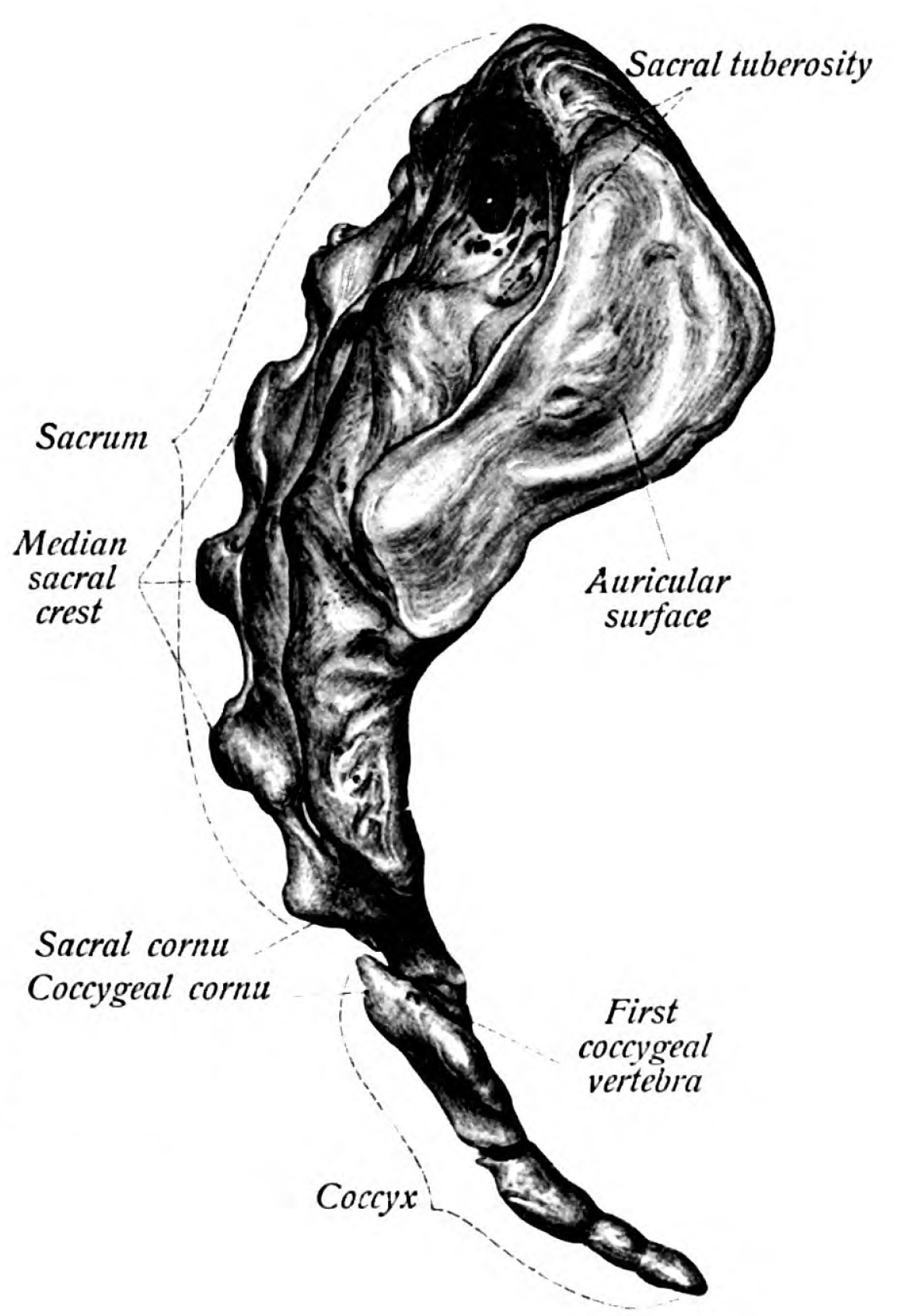
Lateral view of the sacrum and the coccyx

A sacral fracture is a break in the sacrum bone. The sacrum is the large and triangular bone that forms the last part of the vertebral column from the fusion of the five sacral vertebrae. Sacral fractures are relatively uncommon but can be caused by high-energy trauma, bone quality deficiencies, or the overloading of healthy bone. The latter two are usually referred to as insufficiency and stress fractures.

Trauma-related fractures can arise from road traffic accidents or falls. Such fractures are often heterogenous (which means the bone can break in several different places, in several different ways) and almost always appear together with other injuries. This makes them difficult to diagnose and treat. The management may or may not include surgery.

Sacral stress fractures most commonly occur in athletes, especially long-distance runners. Traditionally, sacral stress fractures have been referred to as rare, but such fractures are difficult to diagnose due to their non-specific symptoms and advanced imaging requirements for an accurate diagnosis; thus, they may be underdiagnosed. Sacral stress fractures are usually classed as "low-risk" stress fractures and usually heal with the appropriate amount of rest and do not require surgical intervention.

As with other types of fractures, osteoporosis is a risk factor.

== Classification ==
The Denis Classification System classified sacral fractures into three regions according to the part of the bone affected. The location of the fracture has a major influence on the symptoms experienced.

- Zone 1 (ala), may cause disruption to the nerve root of the fifth lumbar vertebra (L5)
- Zone 2 (sacral foramina), may cause sciatica
- Zone 3 (sacral canal), may cause cauda equina syndrome

== See also ==
- Coccyx fracture (broken tailbone)
