= Iliococcygeal raphe =

Midline where the levator ani muscles meet

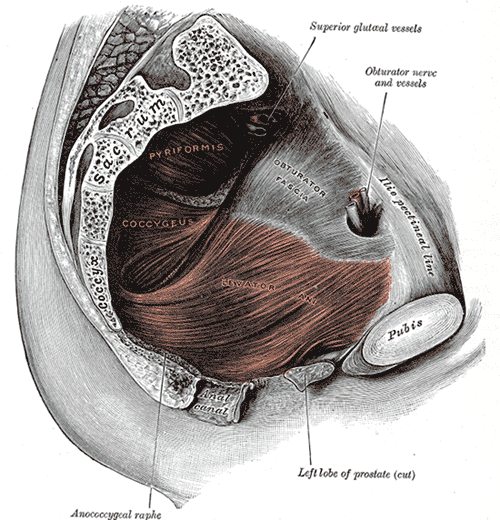
- Left levator ani from within.

Details

Identifiers
- Latin: raphe musculi iliococcygei
- TA98: A04.5.04.018
- TA2: 2400
- FMA: 77257

The iliococcygeal raphe is a raphe representing the midline location where the levatores ani converge.

== See also ==
- Anococcygeal body
