= Raphe =

Raphe (/ˈreɪfi/ RAY-fee; from Ancient Greek: ῥαφή, romanized: rhaphḗ, lit. 'seam'; pl.: raphae or raphes) (meaning needle) has several different meanings in scientific terminology.

In botany, it is commonly used when describing a seam or ridge on seeds.

In phycology, it is used to describe a long opening present in some species of diatom. It is used to secrete mucus, which is used by the diatom to locomote, attach to substrates, or form colonies.

In animal anatomy, it is used to describe a ridged union of continuous biological tissue. There are several different significant anatomical raphes:

- The raphe nucleus is a moderate-size cluster of nuclei found in the brain stem that releases serotonin to the rest of the brain. Selective serotonin reuptake inhibitor (SSRI) antidepressants are believed to act at these nuclei.
- The buccal raphe, which is on the cheek and evidence of the fusion of the maxillary and mandibular processes
- The lingual raphe on the tongue. Obvious physical evidence of the lingual raphe includes the frenulum (also called the frenum), or band of mucous membrane that is visible under the tongue attaching it to the floor of the mouth. If this raphe is too tight at birth, movement of the tongue is restricted and the child is said to be "tongue tied".
- The palatine raphe on the roof of the mouth (or palate). Incomplete fusion of the palatine raphe results in a congenital defect known as cleft palate.
- The pharyngeal raphe joins the left and right pharyngeal constrictors.
- The perineal raphe extends from the anus, through the mid-line of the scrotum (scrotal raphe), and upwards through the ventral mid-line aspect of the penis (penile raphe) in males. In females, it extends from the anus, through the mid-line of the perineum to the posterior junction of the labia majora.
- The anococcygeal raphe, an alternative name for the anococcygeal body
- The iliococcygeal raphe
- The pterygomandibular raphe
- The lateral palpebral raphe
- The mylohyoid raphe

== Teratology ==
In teratology, a malformation or congenital disorder involving a raphe, such as spina bifida, is known as a dysraphism.
