= Posterior sacrococcygeal ligament =

Ligament of the spine

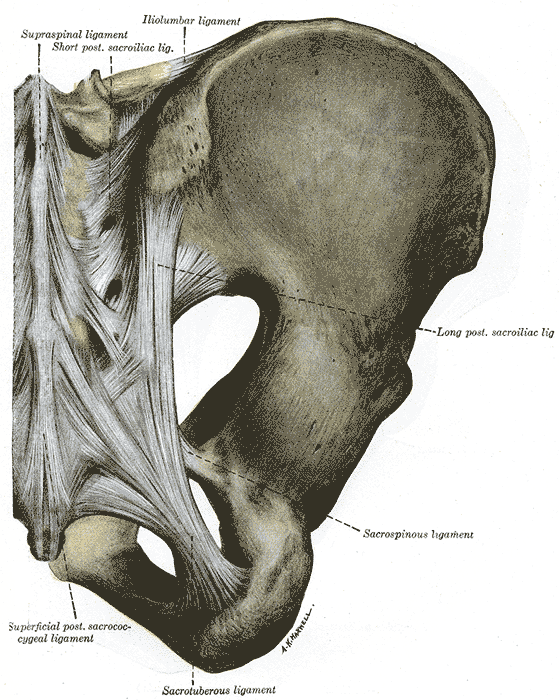
- Articulations of pelvis. Posterior view. (Superficial posterior sacrococcygeal ligament labeled at bottom left.)

Details
- From: Sacrum
- To: Coccyx

Identifiers
- Latin: ligamentum sacrococcygeum posterius, ligamentum sacrococcygeum dorsale
- FMA: 326294

The posterior sacrococcygeal ligament or dorsal sacrococcygeal ligament is a ligament which stretches from the sacrum to the coccyx and thus dorsally across the sacrococcygeal symphysis shared by these two bones.

This ligament is divisible in two parts: A short deep part which unites the two bones, and a larger superficial portion which completes the lower back part of the sacral canal. On either side, two lateral sacrococcygeal ligaments run between the transverse processes of the coccyx and the inferior lateral angle of the sacrum.

It is in relation, behind, with the gluteus maximus.

== Deep part ==
The deep dorsal sacrococcygeal ligament (ligamentum sacrococcygeum posterius profundum) is a continuation of the posterior longitudinal ligament. A flat band arising inside the sacral canal, posteriorly at the orifice of the fifth sacral segment, it descends to the dorsal surface of the coccyx under its longer fellow described below.

== Superficial part ==
The superficial dorsal sacrococcygeal ligament (ligamentum sacrococcygeum posterius superficiale) originates on the free margin of the sacral hiatus to attach on the dorsal surface of the coccyx. It closes the posterior aspect of the most distal part of the sacral canal and corresponds to the ligamenta flava.

== See also ==
- Anterior sacrococcygeal ligament
- Coccydynia (coccyx pain, tailbone pain)
- Ganglion impar
