= Coccygeus muscle =

Muscle of the lower back arising by its apex from the spine of the ischium

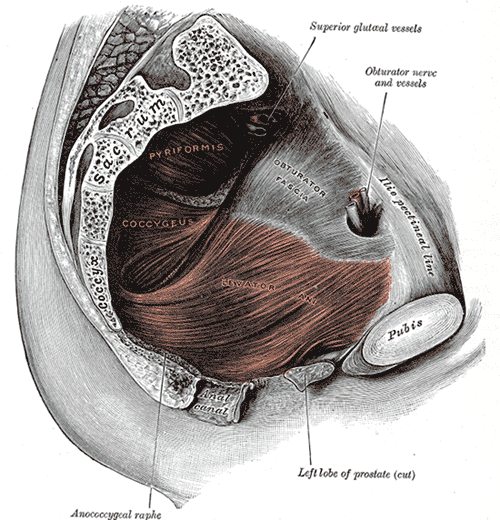
- Left levator ani from within.

Details
- Origin: Sacrospinous ligament and ischial spine
- Insertion: Lateral margin of coccyx and related border of sacrum
- Nerve: Pudendal nerve; sacral nerves: S4, S5 or S3-S4
- Actions: Pulls coccyx forward after defecation, closing in the back part of the outlet of the pelvis

Identifiers
- Latin: musculus coccygeus
- TA98: A04.5.04.011
- TA2: 2412
- FMA: 19088

The coccygeus muscle or ischiococcygeus is a muscle of the pelvic floor located posterior to levator ani and anterior to the sacrospinous ligament.

== Structure ==
The coccygeus muscle is posterior to levator ani and anterior to the sacrospinous ligament in the pelvic floor. It is a triangular plane of muscular and tendinous fibers. It arises by its apex from the spine of the ischium and sacrospinous ligament. It is inserted by its base into the margin of the coccyx and into the side of the lowest piece of the sacrum.

In combination with the levator ani, it forms the pelvic diaphragm.

The pudendal nerve runs between the coccygeus muscle and the piriformis muscle, superficial to the coccygeus muscle.

=== Nerve supply ===
The coccygeus muscle is innervated by the pudendal nerve, which runs between it and the piriformis muscle.

== Function ==
The coccygeus muscle assists the levator ani and piriformis muscle in closing in the back part of the outlet of the pelvis. This helps to support the vagina in women, and the other pelvic organs.

== See also ==
- Extensor coccygis
- Coccyx
- Coccydynia (coccyx pain, tailbone pain)
- Pubococcygeus muscle
