= Iliolumbar ligament =

Ligament of the pelvis

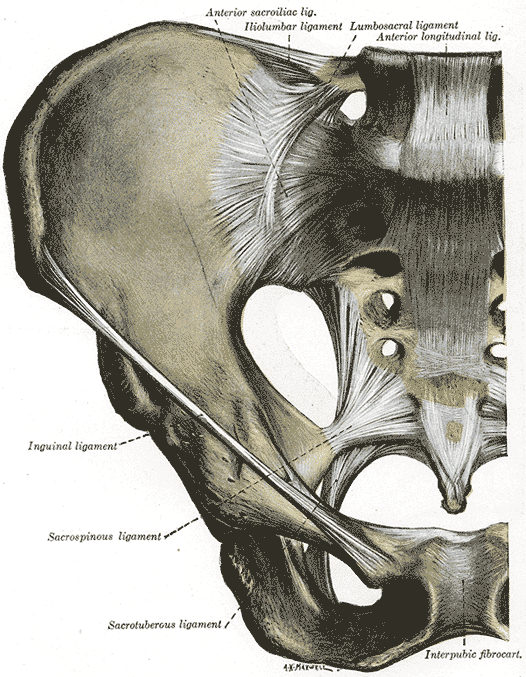
- Articulations of pelvis. Anterior view (iliolumbar ligament labeled at center top)

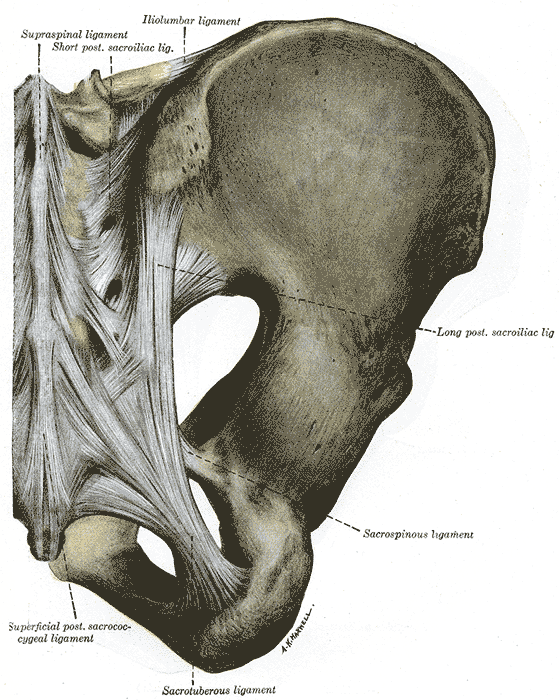
- Articulatios of pelvis. Posterior view (iliolumbar ligament labeled at center top)

Details
- From: Transverse process of fifth lumbar vertebra
- To: Posterior part of iliac crest

Identifiers
- Latin: ligamentum iliolumbale
- TA98: A03.2.07.002
- TA2: 1853
- FMA: 21493

The iliolumbar ligament is a strong ligament which attaches medially to the transverse process of the 5th lumbar vertebra, and laterally to back of the inner lip of the iliac crest (upper margin of ilium).

== Anatomy ==
The ligament extends inferolaterally from its medial attachment, radiating laterally. It represents the thickened inferior border of anterior and middle layers of thoracolumbar fascia. Inferiorly, the ligament is partially continuous with the lumbosacral ligament (which may be considered an inferior subdivision of the iliolumbar ligament).

=== Attachments ===
==== Medial ====
The ligament's medial attachment is at the apex and anteroinferior aspect of the transverse process of lumbar vertebra L5 (and occasionally an additional weak attachment at the transverse process of L4).

==== Lateral ====
Laterally, the ligament attaches onto the posterior part of the inner lip of the iliac crest. More precisely, its lateral attachment is by two main bands:

- the superior band (which is one of the attachments of the quadratus lumborum muscle) attaches onto the iliac crest anterior to the sacroiliac joint. The superior band is continuous superiorly with the anterior layer of lumbodorsal fascia. Anterior to the superior band is the psoas major muscle; posterior to it the muscles occupying the vertebral groove; superior to it the quadratus lumborum muscle.
- the inferior band (extending from the inferior aspect of transverse process and body of L5) extends across the anterior sacroiliac ligament (and intermingling with it) to attach onto the posterior border of the iliac fossa.
  - A vertical component of the inferior band extends to the posterior portion of the iliopectineal line.
  - A posterior component of the inferior band extends posterior to the quadratum lumborum muscle to attach onto the ilium.

=== Development ===
In newborns and children, this structure is in fact muscular; the muscle tissue is then gradually replaced by ligamentous tissue until the fifth decade of life.

=== Variation ===
Occasionally, a small ligamentous band stretches from the apex of transverse process of L4 inferior-ward to the iliac crest posterior to the main ligament; usually, fibrous strands are found between this latter process and the iliac crest, but these are only considered a true ligament when dense enough.

== Function ==
The iliolumbar ligament strengthens the lumbosacral joint assisted by the lateral lumbosacral ligament, and, like all other vertebral joints, by the posterior and anterior longitudinal ligaments, the ligamenta flava, and the interspinous and supraspinous ligaments. It reduces the range of movement of the lumbosacral joint.
