= Anterior sacrococcygeal ligament =

Ligament of the spine

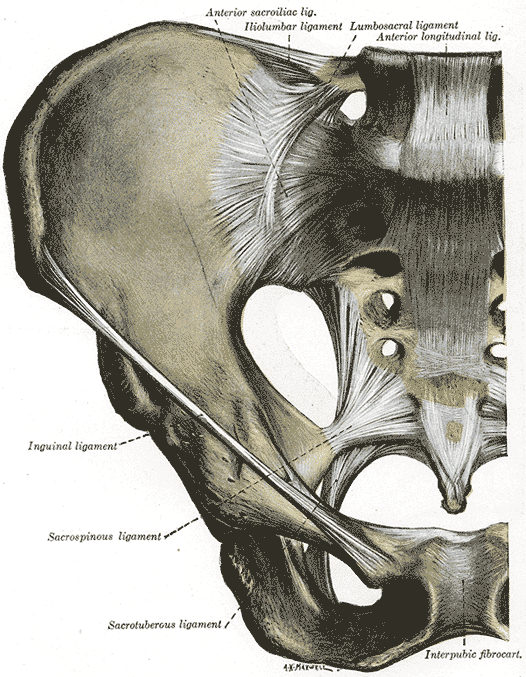
- Articulations of pelvis. Anterior view. (Anterior sacrococcygeal lig. visible at bottom left.)

Details
- From: Sacrum
- To: Coccyx

Identifiers
- Latin: ligamentum sacrococcygeum anterius
- TA98: A03.2.08.004
- TA2: 1691
- FMA: 76850

The anterior sacrococcygeal ligament or ventral sacrococcygeal ligament consists of a few irregular fibers, which descend from the anterior surface of the sacrum to the front of the coccyx, blending with the periosteum.

This short ligament forms the continuation of the anterior longitudinal ligament and stretches over the sacrococcygeal symphysis.

== See also ==
- Posterior sacrococcygeal ligament
- Coccydynia (coccyx pain, tailbone pain)
- Ganglion impar
