= Anococcygeal body =

Fibrous median raphe in the floor of the pelvis

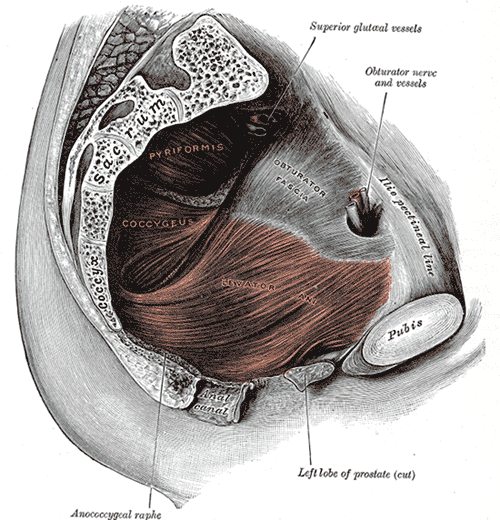
- Left levator ani seen from within (anococcygeal body labeled at lower left)

Details

Identifiers
- Latin: corpus anococcygeum, ligamentum anococcygeum
- TA98: A04.5.04.016
- TA2: 2399
- FMA: 20273

The anococcygeal body (anococcygeal ligament or anococcygeal raphe) is a fibrous median raphe in the floor of the pelvis, which extends between the coccyx and the margin of the anus. It is composed of fibers of the levator ani muscle that unite with the muscle of the opposite side, muscle fibres from external anal sphincter, and fibrous connective tissue.

The fibers of the levator ani pass downward and backward to the middle line of the floor of the pelvis; the most posterior are inserted into the side of the last two segments of the coccyx; those placed more anteriorly unite with the muscle of the opposite side, in the anococcygeal body.

== See also ==
- Iliococcygeal raphe
