= Coccyx =

Bone of the pelvis

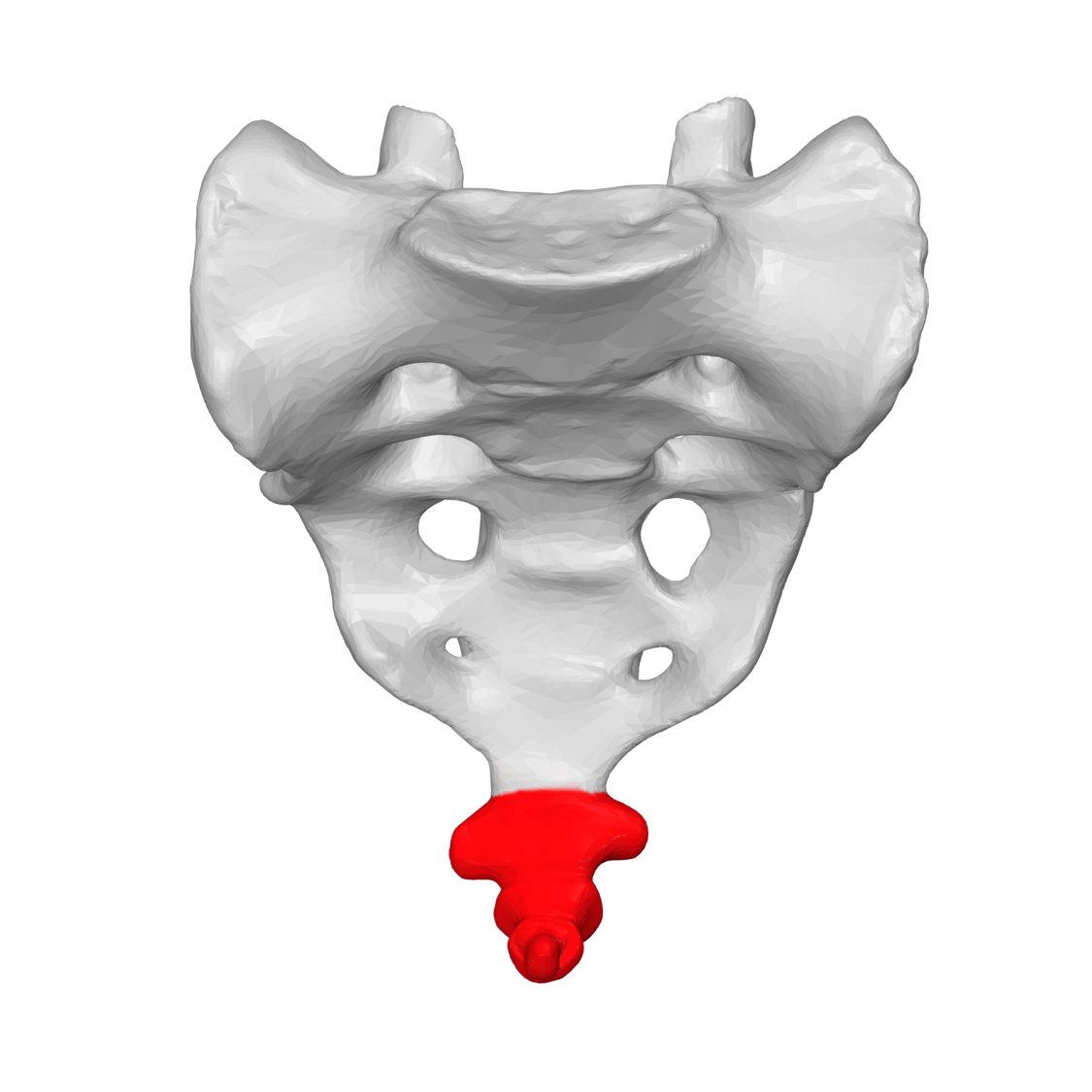
- The coccyx

- The coccyx is the final bone in the vertebral column that surrounds the spinal cord.

Details
- Pronunciation: /ˈkɒksɪks/ KOK-siks

Identifiers
- Latin: os coccygis
- MeSH: D003050
- TA98: A02.2.06.001
- TA2: 1092
- FMA: 20229

The coccyx (pl.: coccyges or coccyxes), commonly referred to as the tailbone, is the final segment of the vertebral column in all apes, and analogous structures in certain other mammals such as horses. In tailless primates (e.g. humans and other great apes) since Nacholapithecus (a Miocene hominoid), the coccyx is the remnant of a vestigial tail. In animals with bony tails, it is known as tailhead or dock, in bird anatomy as tailfan. It comprises three to five separate or fused coccygeal vertebrae below the sacrum, attached to the sacrum by a fibrocartilaginous joint, the sacrococcygeal symphysis, which permits limited movement between the sacrum and the coccyx.

== Structure ==
A coccyx with four vertebrae below the sacrum

The coccyx is formed of three, four or five rudimentary vertebrae. It articulates superiorly with the sacrum. In each of the first three segments may be traced a rudimentary body and articular and transverse processes; the last piece (sometimes the third) is a mere nodule of bone. The transverse processes are most prominent and noticeable on the first coccygeal segment. All the segments lack pedicles, laminae and spinous processes. The first segment is the largest; it resembles the lowest sacral vertebra, and often exists as a separate piece; the remaining ones diminish in size caudally.

Most anatomy books incorrectly state that the coccyx is normally fused in adults. It has been shown that the coccyx may, in some people, consist of up to five separate bony segments, the most common configuration being two or three segments.

=== Surfaces ===
The anterior surface is slightly concave and marked with three transverse grooves which indicate the junctions of the different segments. It gives attachment to the anterior sacrococcygeal ligament and the levatores ani and supports part of the rectum. The posterior surface is convex, marked by transverse grooves similar to those on the anterior surface, and presents on either side a linear row of tubercles – the undeveloped articular processes of the coccygeal vertebrae. Of these, the superior pair are the largest, and are called the coccygeal cornua they project caudally, and articulate with the cornua of the sacrum, and on either side complete the foramen for the transmission of the posterior division of the fifth sacral nerve.

=== Borders ===
The lateral borders are thin and exhibit a series of small bony protrusions, which represent the transverse processes of the coccygeal vertebrae. Of these, the first is the largest; it is flattened anteriorly, and often extends to join the lower part of the thin lateral edge of the sacrum, thus completing the foramen for the transmission of the anterior division of the fifth sacral nerve; the others diminish in size caudally, and are often lacking. The borders of the coccyx are narrow, and give attachment on either side to the sacrotuberous and sacrospinous ligaments, to the coccygeus and levator ani in front of the ligaments, and to the gluteus maximus behind them.

=== Apex ===
The apex is rounded, and has attached to it the tendon of the external anal sphincter; it may be divided in two.

=== Coccygeal fossa ===
The coccygeal fossa is a shallow depression on the posterior surface between the sacrum and the perineum, located in the intergluteal cleft that runs from just below the sacrum to the perineum. It is not consistently present in all humans. The coccygeal fossa marks the deepest part of the pelvic floor, next to the coccyx. The levator ani has its origin here.

=== Extensor coccygis ===
The extensor coccygis is a slender muscle fascicle, which is not always present. It extends over the caudal portion of the posterior surface of the sacrum and coccyx. It arises by tendinous fibers from the last segment of the sacrum, or first piece of the coccyx, and passes downward to be inserted into the lower part of the coccyx. It is an evolutionary relic of the extensor muscle of the caudal vertebrae of other animals, enabling limited coccygeal motion.

=== Sacrococcygeal and intercoccygeal joints ===
The joints are variable and may be: (1) synovial joints; (2) thin discs of fibrocartilage; (3) intermediate between these two; (4) ossified.

=== Attachments ===
The anterior side of the coccyx has attachments to the levator ani muscle, coccygeus, iliococcygeus, and pubococcygeus, anococcygeal raphe. Attached to the posterior side is the gluteus maximus, which extends the thigh at the hip joint. The ligaments attached to the coccyx include the anterior and posterior sacrococcygeal ligaments which are the continuations of the anterior and posterior longitudinal ligaments that extend along the entire spine. The lateral sacrococcygeal ligaments complete the foramina for the last sacral nerve. Some fibers of the sacrospinous and sacrotuberous ligaments (arising from the spine of the ischium and the ischial tuberosity respectively) also attach to the coccyx. An extension of the pia mater, the filum terminale, extends from the apex of the conus, and inserts on the coccyx.

=== Haemal arches ===
Haemal arches are usually absent in adult humans, though they appear and are resorbed during the embryonic phase of development. Rarely, however, the first coccygeal vertebra bears a haemal arch on its ventral side. More rarely, the second coccygeal vertebra may also have a haemal arch.

== Function ==
The coccyx is not entirely useless in humans, because it has attachments to various muscles, tendons and ligaments. However, these muscles, tendons and ligaments are also attached at many other points, to stronger structures than the coccyx. It is doubtful that the coccyx attachments are important to the well-being of humans, given the large number of coccygectomy procedures performed annually to treat coccydynia. Reviews of studies covering more than 700 coccygectomies found the operation was successful in relieving pain in 84% of cases. 12% of the time, the only major complication faced was infection due to the proximity to the anus. One notable complication of coccygectomy is an increased risk of perineal hernia.

== Clinical significance ==
Injuring the coccyx can give rise to a painful condition called coccydynia and one or more of the bones or the connections thereof may be broken, fractured tailbone. A number of tumors are known to involve the coccyx; of these, the most common is sacrococcygeal teratoma. Both coccydynia and coccygeal tumors may require surgical removal of the coccyx (coccygectomy). One very rare complication of coccygectomy is a type of perineal hernia known as a coccygeal hernia.

== Etymology ==
The term coccyx is derived from the ancient Greek word κόκκυξ kokkyx "cuckoo"; the latter is attested in the writings of the Greek physician Herophilus to denote the end of the vertebral column. This Greek name for the cuckoo was applied as the last three or four bones of the coccyx resemble the beak of this bird, when viewed from the side.

This established etymological explanation can also be found in the writings of the 16th century anatomist Andreas Vesalius who wrote: os cuculi, a similitudine rostri cuculi avis (the cuckoo bone shows a likeness to the beak of the cuckoo bird). Vesalius used the Latin expression os cuculi, with os, bone and cuculus, the Latin name for the cuckoo. The 16th/17th century French anatomist Jean Riolan the Younger gives a rather hilarious etymological explanation, as he writes: quia crepitus, qui per sedimentum exeunt, ad is os allisi, cuculi vocis similitudinem effingunt (because the sound of the farts that leave the anus and dash against this bone, shows a likeness to the call of the cuckoo). Riolan's explanation is not considered credible.

Besides os cuculi, os caudae, with caudae, of the tail is attested. This Latin expression might be the source of the English, French language, German and Dutch terms tailbone, l'os de la queue, Schwanzbein and staartbeen. In the current official anatomic Latin nomenclature, Terminologia Anatomica, coccyx and os coccygis is used.

== Additional images ==
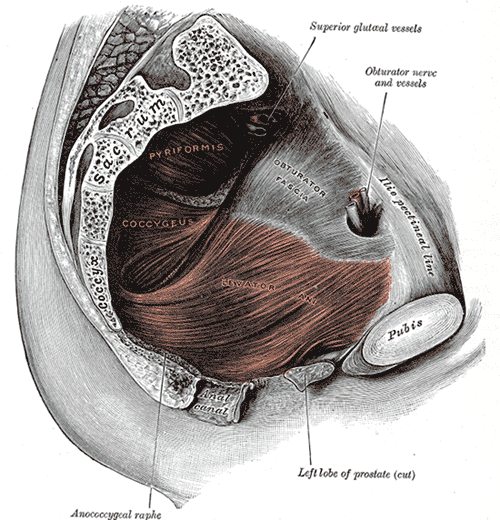
The coccyx sits below the sacrum and behind the pelvic cavity.

== See also ==
- Bone terminology
- Ganglion impar
- Human vestigiality
- Perineum
- Pygostyle
