= Ganglion impar =

Details

Identifiers
- Latin: ganglion impar
- TA98: A14.3.01.037
- TA2: 6616

The pelvic portion of each sympathetic trunk is situated in front of the sacrum, medial to the anterior sacral foramina. It consists of four or five small sacral ganglia, connected together by interganglionic cords, and continuous above with the abdominal portion. Below, the two pelvic sympathetic trunks converge, and end on the front of the coccyx in a small ganglion, the ganglion impar, also known as azygos or ganglion of Walther.

== Clinical significance ==
This ganglion plays a crucial role in patients experiencing pain in the pelvic and perineal structures, as it provides both nociceptive and sympathetic supply to these regions. Afferent innervation to the ganglion impar comes from the perineum, distal rectum, anus, distal urethra, and distal vagina. The indications for ganglion impar blockade are based on the anatomical location of pain and include various conditions such as perineal pain (with or without malignancy), rectal/anal pain (proctitis), distal urethral pain, vulvodynia, scrotal pain, female pelvic/vaginal pain (distal 1/3), sympathetically-maintained pain (e.g., Complex Regional Pain Syndrome), endometriosis, chronic prostatitis, proctalgia fugax, coccydynia, radiation proctitis, postherpetic neuralgia, and burning localized perineal pain associated with urgency.
