= Lumbosacral joint =

Joint between the last lumbar vertebra and the first sacral vertebra

Details

Identifiers
- Latin: articulatio lumbosacralis
- TA98: A03.2.07.001
- TA2: 1687
- FMA: 16209

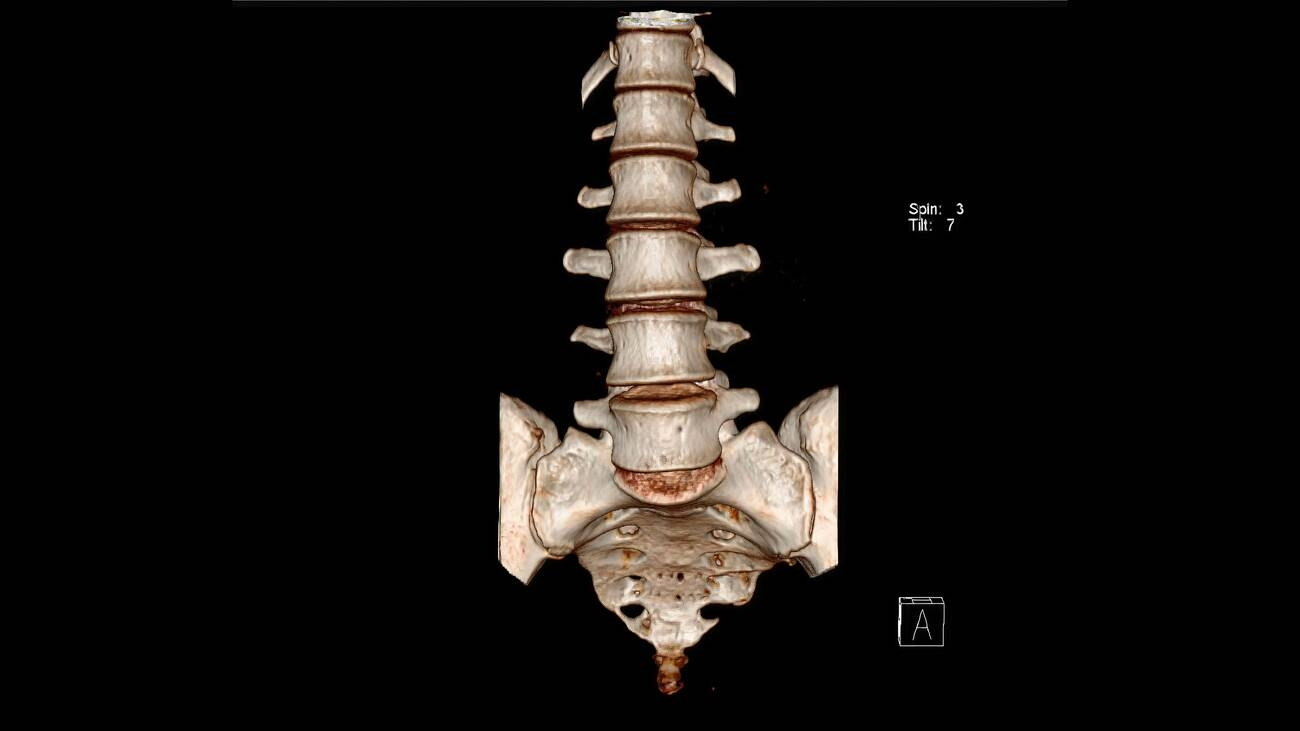
Anterior view of a 3D volume-rendered CT reconstruction of the lumbosacral junction, showing the sequential alignment of the lumbar vertebrae and the articulation of the fifth lumbar vertebra (L5) onto the base of the sacrum (S1).

The lumbosacral joint is a joint of the body, between the last lumbar vertebra and the first sacral segment of the vertebral column. In some ways, calling it a "joint" (singular) is a misnomer, since the lumbosacral junction includes a disc between the lower lumbar vertebral body and the uppermost sacral vertebral body, as well as two lumbosacral facet joints (right and left zygapophysial joints).
