= Sacral spinal nerve 5 =

Sacral spinal nerve
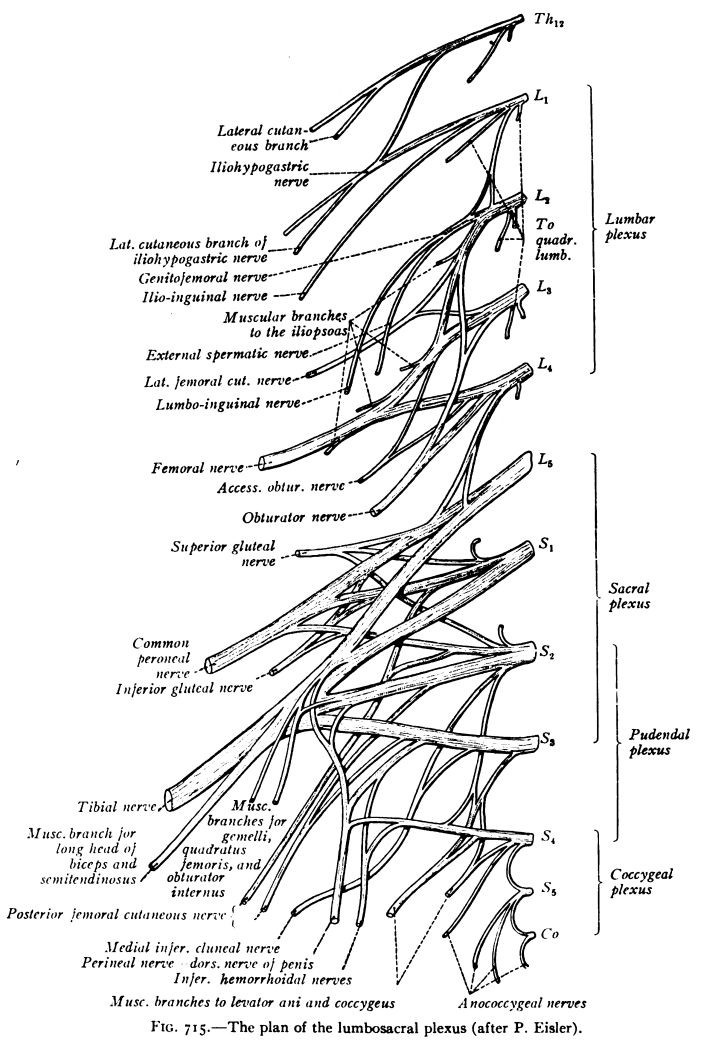
- The plan of the lumbosacral plexus

Details

Identifiers
- Latin: nervi spinalis
- FMA: 6427

The sacral spinal nerve 5 (S5) is a spinal nerve of the sacral segment.

It originates from the spinal column from below the 5th body of the sacrum.

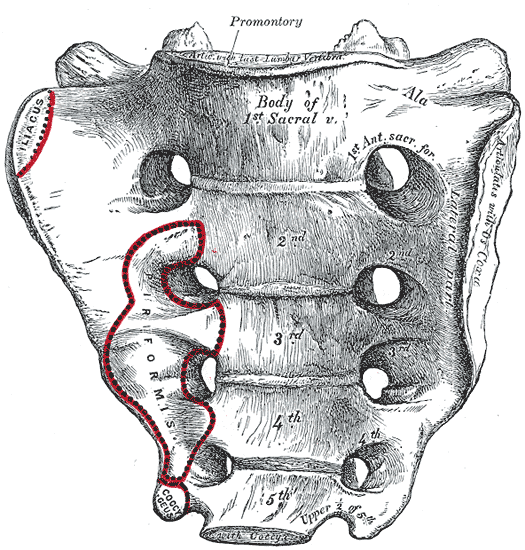
Sacrum, showing bodies in center.

S5 supplies the coccygeus muscle.
