= List of external rotators of the human body =

External rotation (or extorsion or lateral rotation) is an anatomical term of motion referring to rotation away from the center of the body. The external rotator muscles include:

== Muscles ==
- of arm/humerus at shoulder
  - Deltoid muscle
  - Supraspinatus
  - Infraspinatus
  - Teres minor
- of thigh/femur at hip
  - Gluteus maximus
  - Lateral rotator group
    - piriformis
    - gemellus superior
    - obturator internus
    - pectineus
    - gemellus inferior
    - obturator externus
    - quadratus femoris
  - Sartorius
- of leg at knee
  - Biceps femoris
- of eyeball (motion is also called "extorsion" or excyclotorsion)
  - Inferior rectus muscle
  - Inferior oblique muscle

== See also ==
- List of internal rotators of the human body
