= Lateral rotator group =

Group of six small muscles of the hip

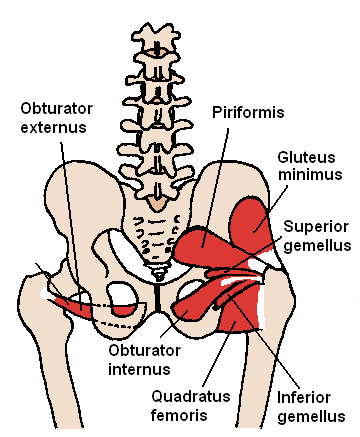
- The lateral rotator group and the gluteus minimus muscle, posterior view

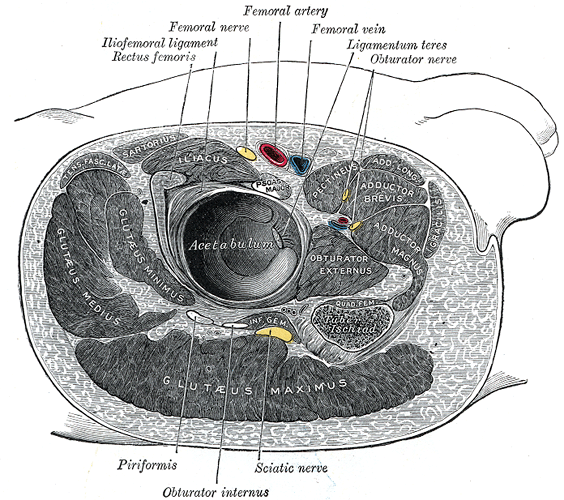
- Structures surrounding left hip joint

Details
- Origin: At or below the acetabulum of the ilium
- Insertion: On or near the greater trochanter of the femur
- Artery: Inferior gluteal artery, lateral sacral artery, superior gluteal artery
- Nerve: Obturator nerve, nerve to the piriformis, nerve to quadratus femoris
- Actions: Lateral rotation of hip
- Antagonist: Gluteus minimus muscle, gluteus medius muscle

The lateral rotator group is a group of six small muscles of the hip which all externally (laterally) rotate the femur in the hip joint. It consists of the following muscles: piriformis, gemellus superior, obturator internus, gemellus inferior, quadratus femoris and the obturator externus.

All muscles in the lateral rotator group originate from the hip bone and insert on to the upper extremity of the femur. The muscles are innervated by the sacral plexus (L4-S2), except the obturator externus muscle, which is innervated by the lumbar plexus.

== Individual muscles ==
Muscle	origin	insertion	innervation
Piriformis muscle	Anterior surface of sacrum between and laterally to the anterior sacral foramina	Superior boundary of greater trochanter	Nerve to the piriformis (S1-S2)
Gemellus superior muscle	Ischial spine	Upper edge of Obturator internus muscle tendon (indirectly greater trochanter)	Nerve to obturator internus (L5-S2)
Obturator internus muscle	Medial surface of obturator membrane and the surrounding bone	Medial surface of greater trochanter	Nerve to obturator internus (L5-S2)
Gemellus inferior muscle	Just above the tuberosity of the ischium	Lower edge of Obturator internus muscle tendon (indirectly greater trochanter)	Nerve to quadratus femoris (L4-S1)
Quadratus femoris muscle	Lateral edge of the tuberosity of the ischium	Intertrochanteric crest	Nerve to quadratus femoris (L4-S1)
Obturator externus muscle	Lateral surface of obturator membrane and the ischiopubic ramus	Trochanteric fossa	Posterior branch of obturator nerve (L3-L4)

== Other lateral rotators ==
This group does not include all muscles which aid in lateral rotation of the hip joint: rather it is a collection of ones which are known for primarily performing this action. Other muscles that contribute to lateral rotation of the hip include:

- Gluteus maximus muscle (lower fibres)
- Gluteus medius muscle and gluteus minimus muscle when the hip is flexed (become medial rotators when hip is extended)
- Psoas major muscle
- Psoas minor muscle
- Sartorius muscle

== Additional images ==
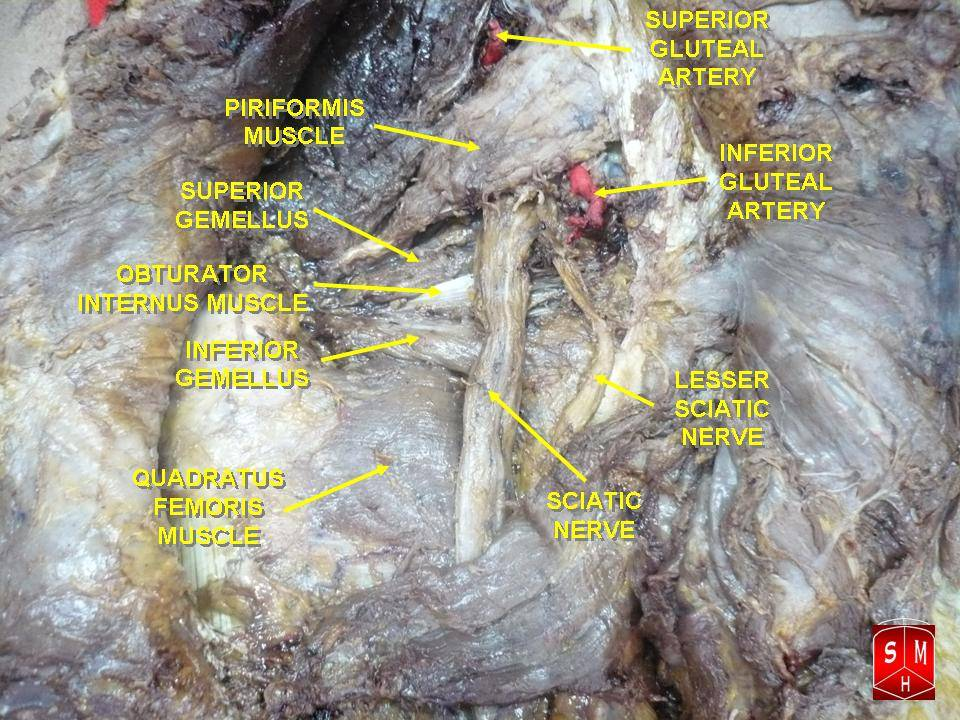
Dissection of lateral rotator group (obturator externus hidden under quadratus femoris muscle) seen from the back

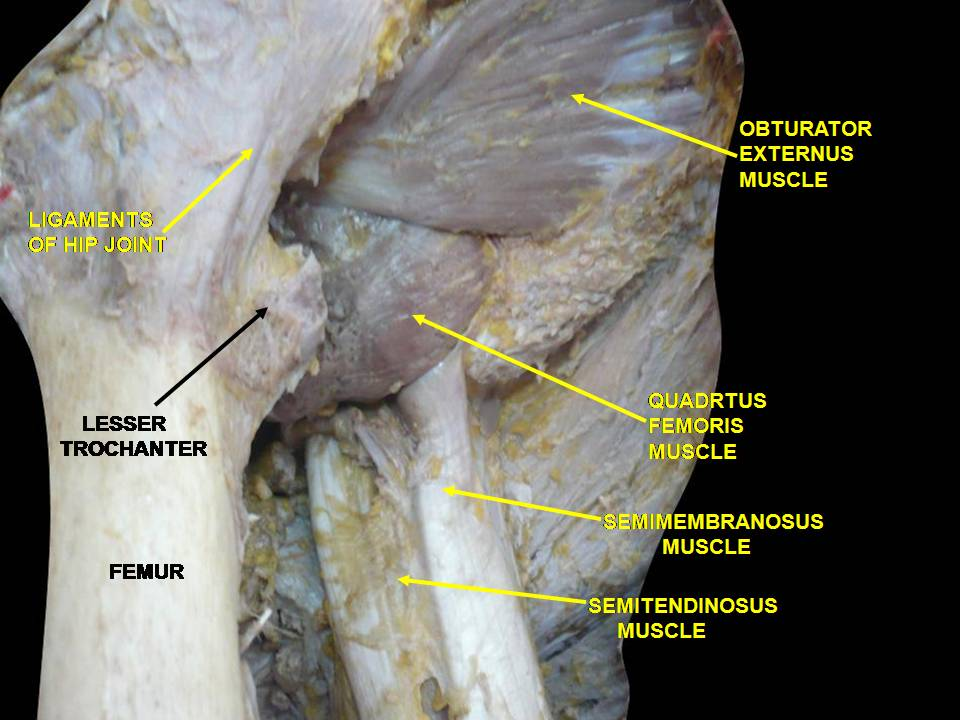
Muscles of thigh as seen from the front

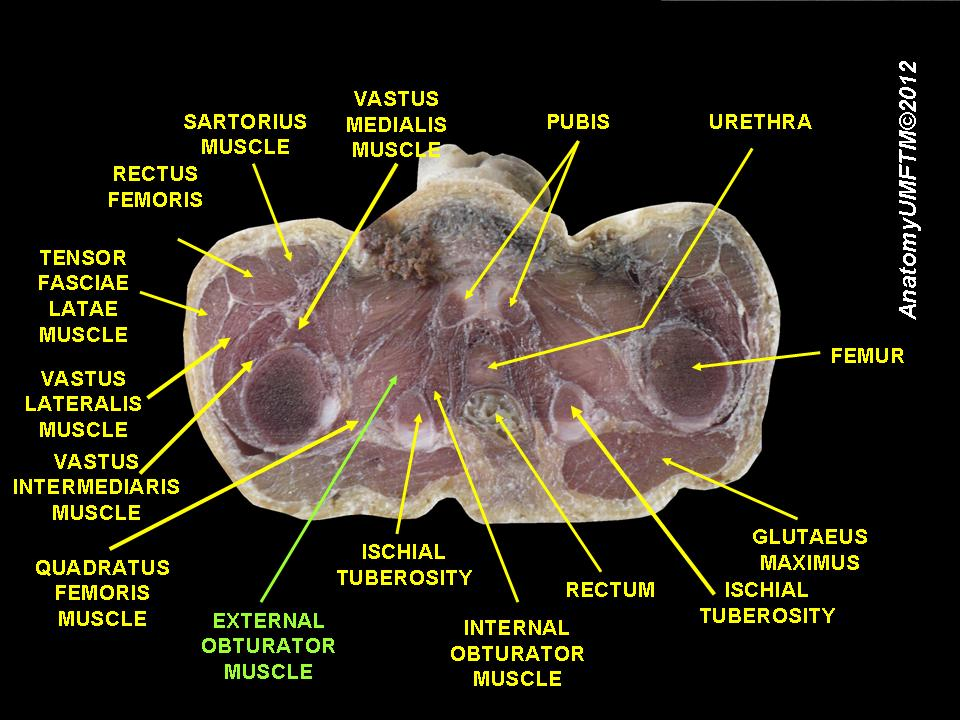
Cross section of pelvic region

== See also ==
- Hip anatomy
