= Sacral spinal nerve 1 =

Spinal nerve at the base of the spinal column

Sacral spinal nerve
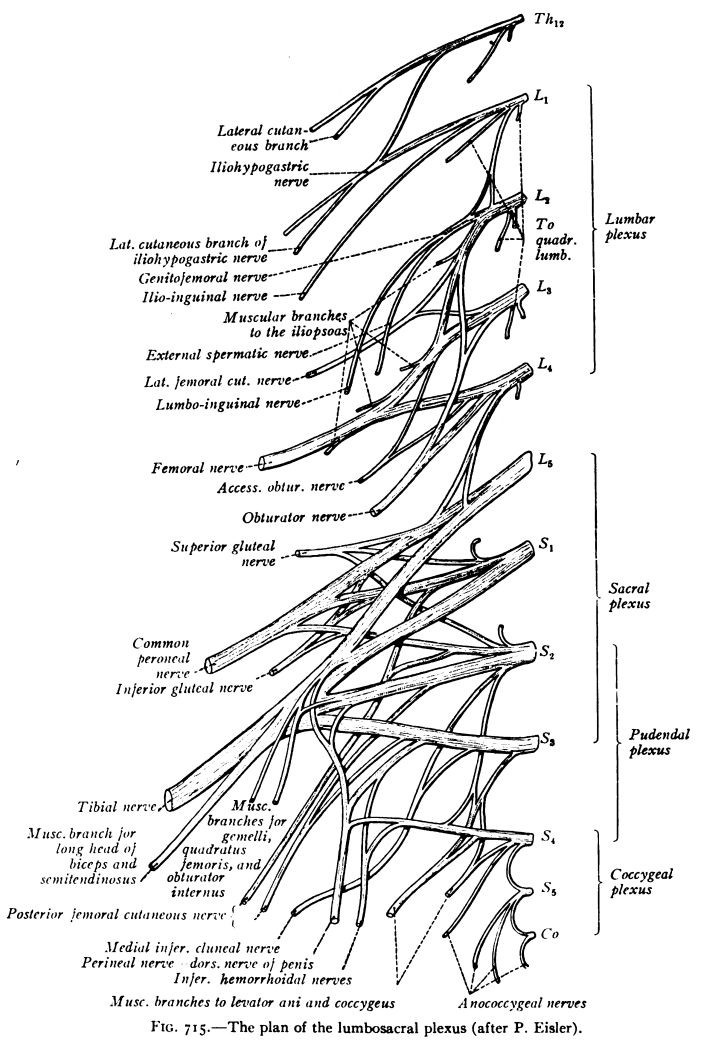
- The plan of the lumbosacral plexus

Details

Identifiers
- Latin: nervi spinalis
- FMA: 6423

The sacral spinal nerve 1 (S1) is a spinal nerve of the sacral segment.

It originates from the spinal column from below the 1st body of the sacrum.

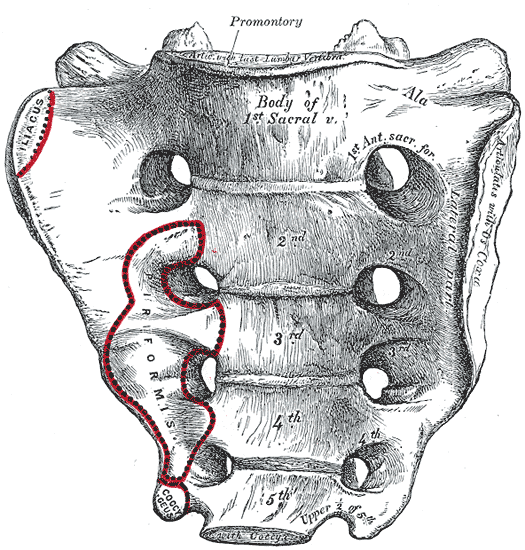
Sacrum, showing bodies in center.

== Muscles ==
S1 supplies many muscles, either directly or through nerves originating from S1. They are not innervated with S1 as single origin, but partly by S1 and partly by other spinal nerves. The muscles are:

- gluteus maximus muscle
- gluteus medius muscle
- gluteus minimus muscle
- tensor fasciae latae
- piriformis
- obturator internus muscle
- inferior gemellus
- superior gemellus
- quadratus femoris
- semitendinosus
- gastrocnemius
- flexor hallucis longus
- abductor digiti minimi
- quadratus plantae

== Additional images ==
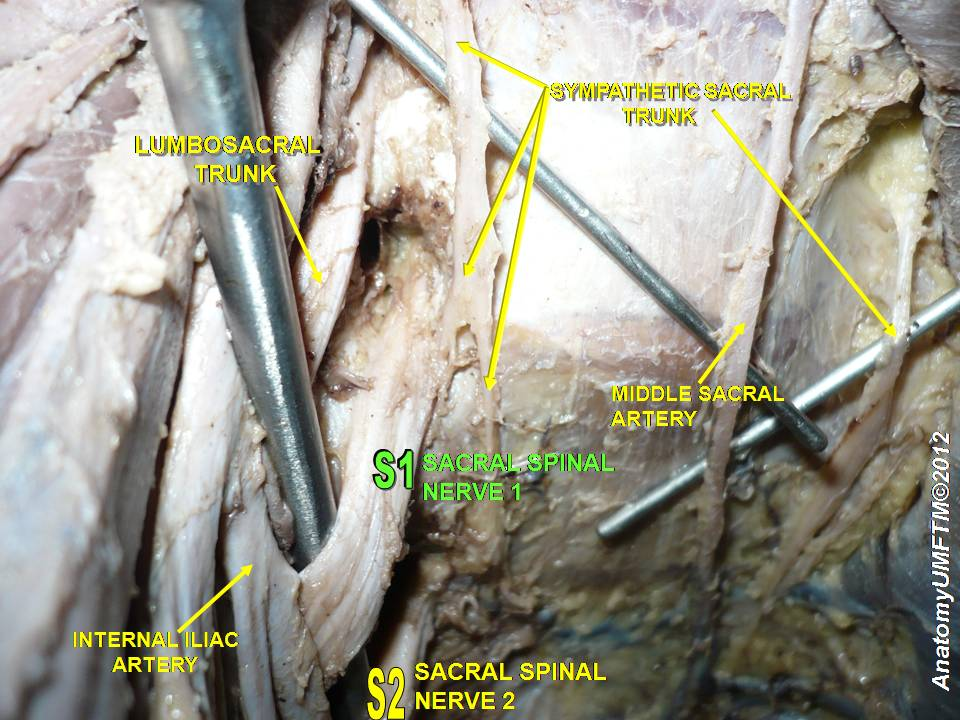
Sacral spinal nerve 1

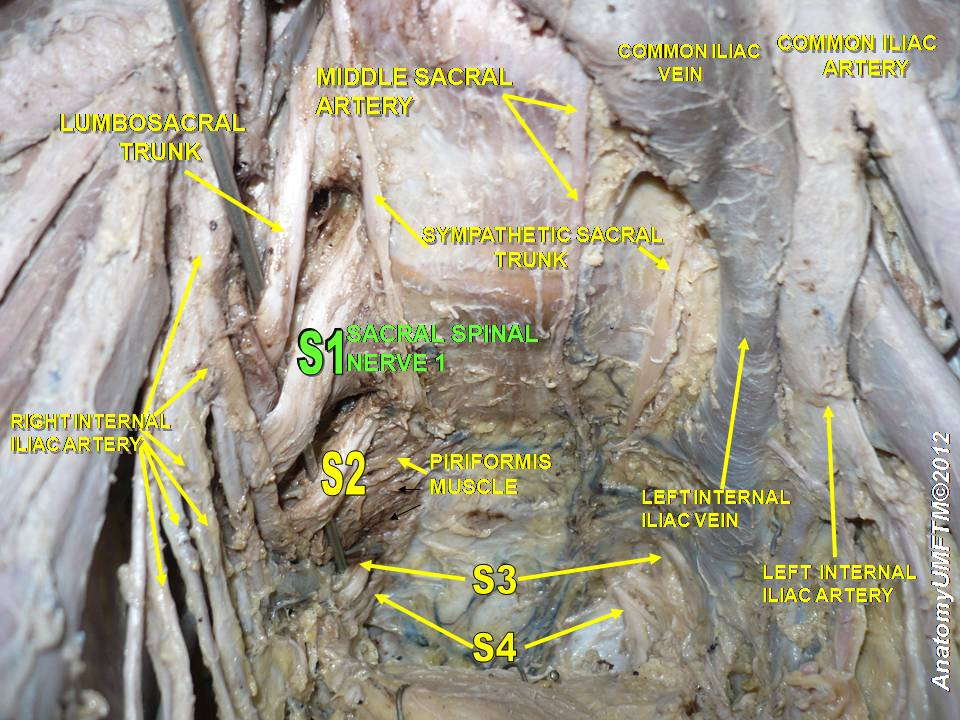
Sacral spinal nerve 1

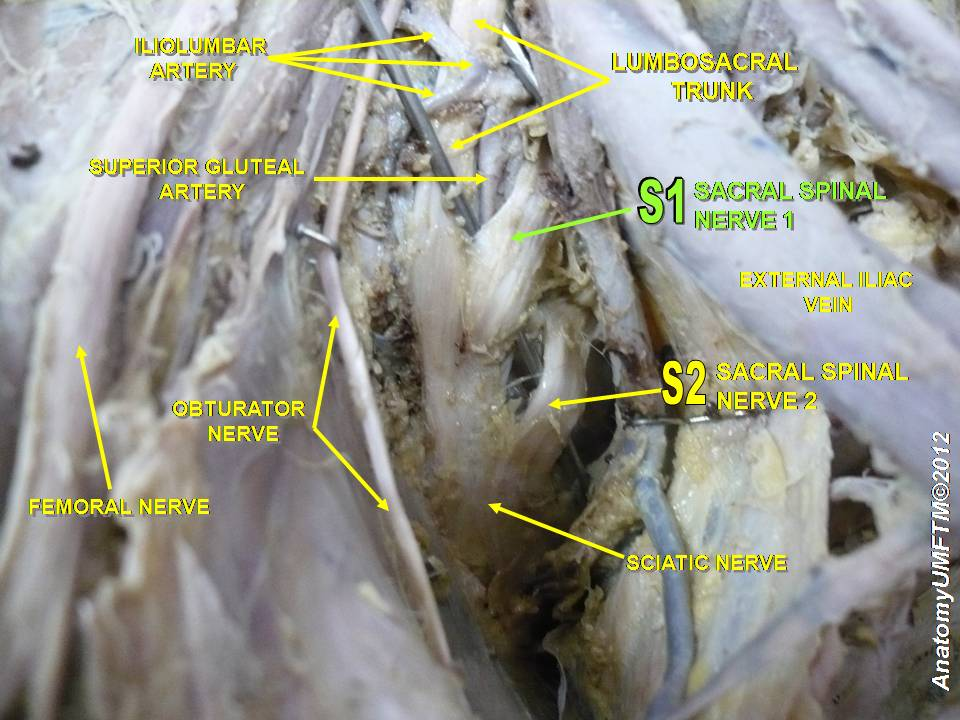
Sacral spinal nerve 1
