= List of internal rotators of the human body =

In anatomy, internal rotation (also known as medial rotation) is an anatomical term referring to rotation towards the center of the body.

== Muscles ==
The muscles of internal rotation include:

- of arm/humerus at shoulder
  - Anterior part of the deltoid muscle
  - Subscapularis
  - Teres major
  - Latissimus dorsi
  - Pectoralis major
- of thigh/femur at hip
  - Tensor fasciae latae
  - Gluteus minimus
  - Anterior fibers of Gluteus medius
  - Adductor longus and Adductor brevis
- of leg at knee
  - Popliteus
  - Semimembranosus
  - Semitendinosus
  - Sartorius
- of eyeball (motion is also called "intorsion" or incyclotorsion)
  - Superior rectus muscle
  - Superior oblique muscle

== See also ==
- List of external rotators of the human body
