= Sacral spinal nerve 2 =

Spinal nerve of the sacral segment

Sacral spinal nerve
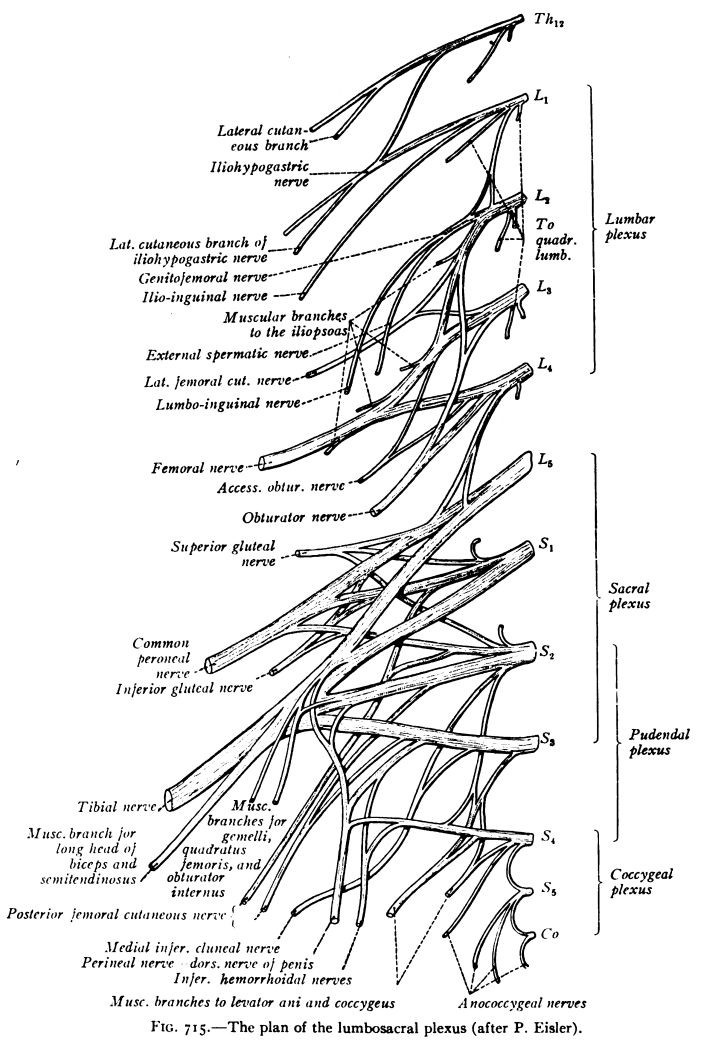
- The plan of the lumbosacral plexus

Details

Identifiers
- Latin: nervi spinalis
- FMA: 6424

The sacral spinal nerve 2 (S2) is a spinal nerve of the sacral segment.

It originates from the spinal column from below the 2nd body of the sacrum

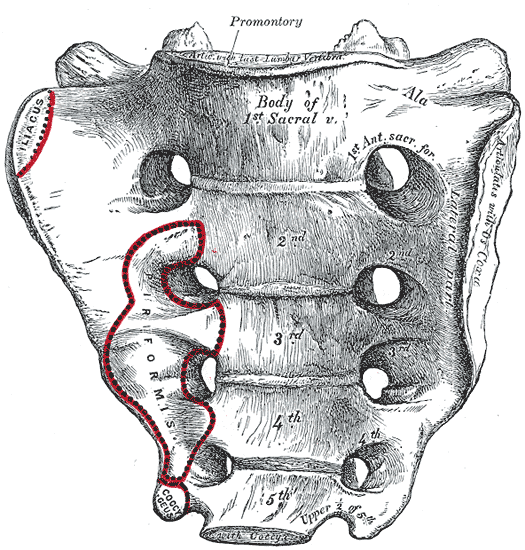
Sacrum, showing bodies in center.

== Muscles ==
S2 supplies many muscles, either directly or through nerves originating from S2. They are not innervated with S2 as single origin, but partly by S2 and partly by other spinal nerves. They are most commonly known to govern the toes. The muscles are:

- sphincter urethrae membranaceae
- gluteus maximus muscle
- piriformis
- obturator internus muscle
- superior gemellus
- semitendinosus
- gastrocnemius
- flexor hallucis longus
- abductor digiti minimi
- quadratus plantae
- levator ani

== Additional images ==
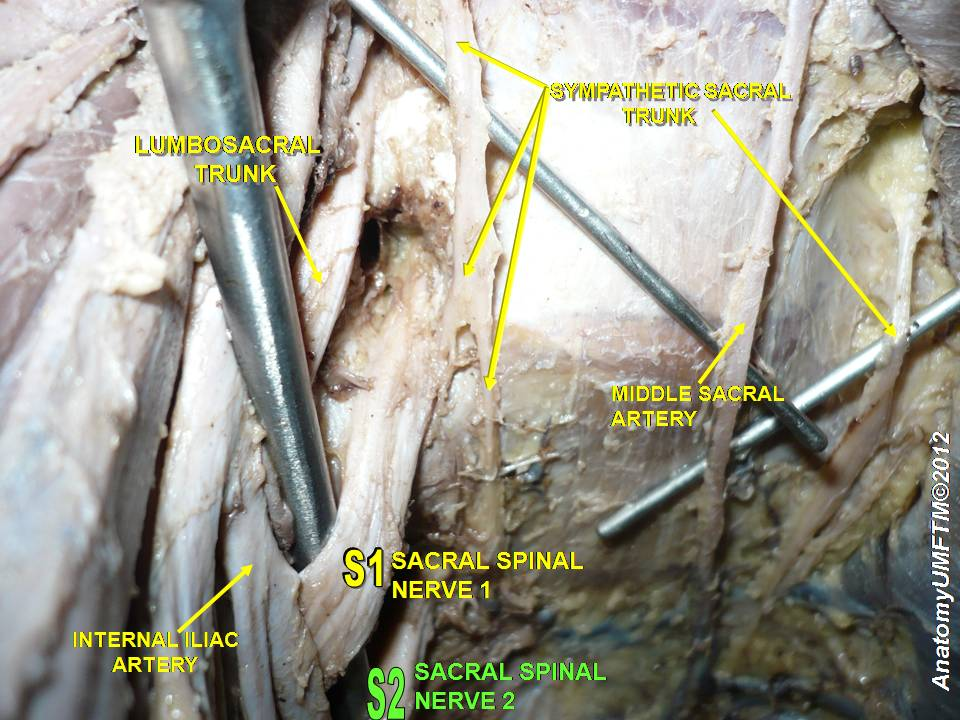
Sacral spinal nerve 2

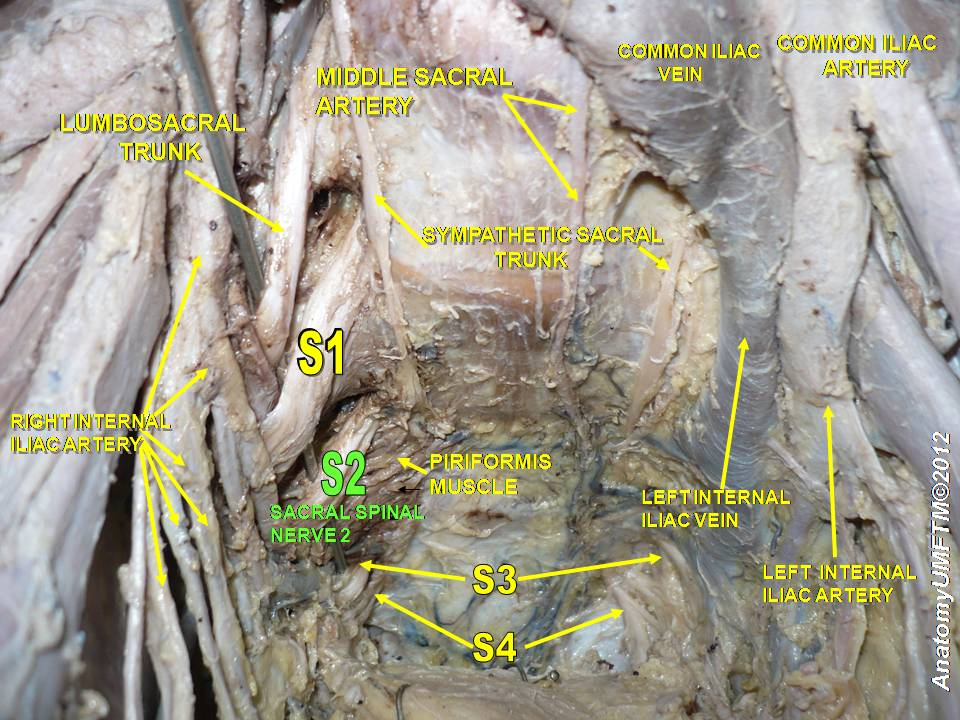
Sacral spinal nerve 2

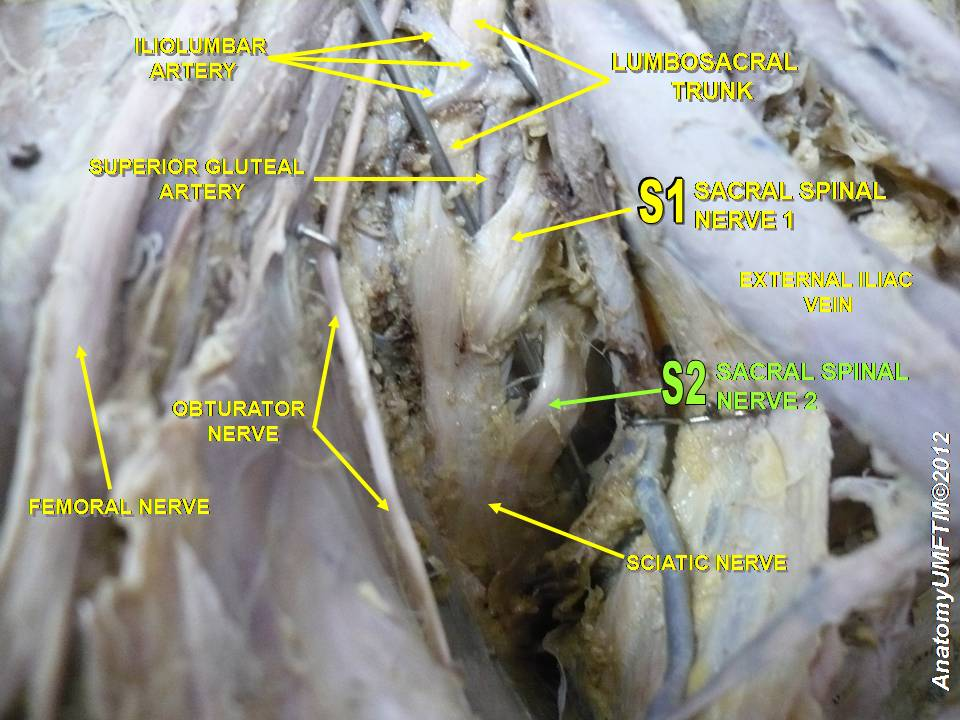
Sacral spinal nerve 2
