= Gluteal aponeurosis =

Details

Identifiers
- Latin: aponeurosis glutaea
- TA98: A04.7.02.009
- TA2: 2601
- FMA: 58771 77262, 58771

The gluteal aponeurosis is a fibrous membrane, from the fascia lata, that lies between the iliac crest and the superior border of the gluteus maximus. A part of the gluteus medius arises from this membrane.
