= Piriformis muscle =

Hip muscle in the lateral rotator group

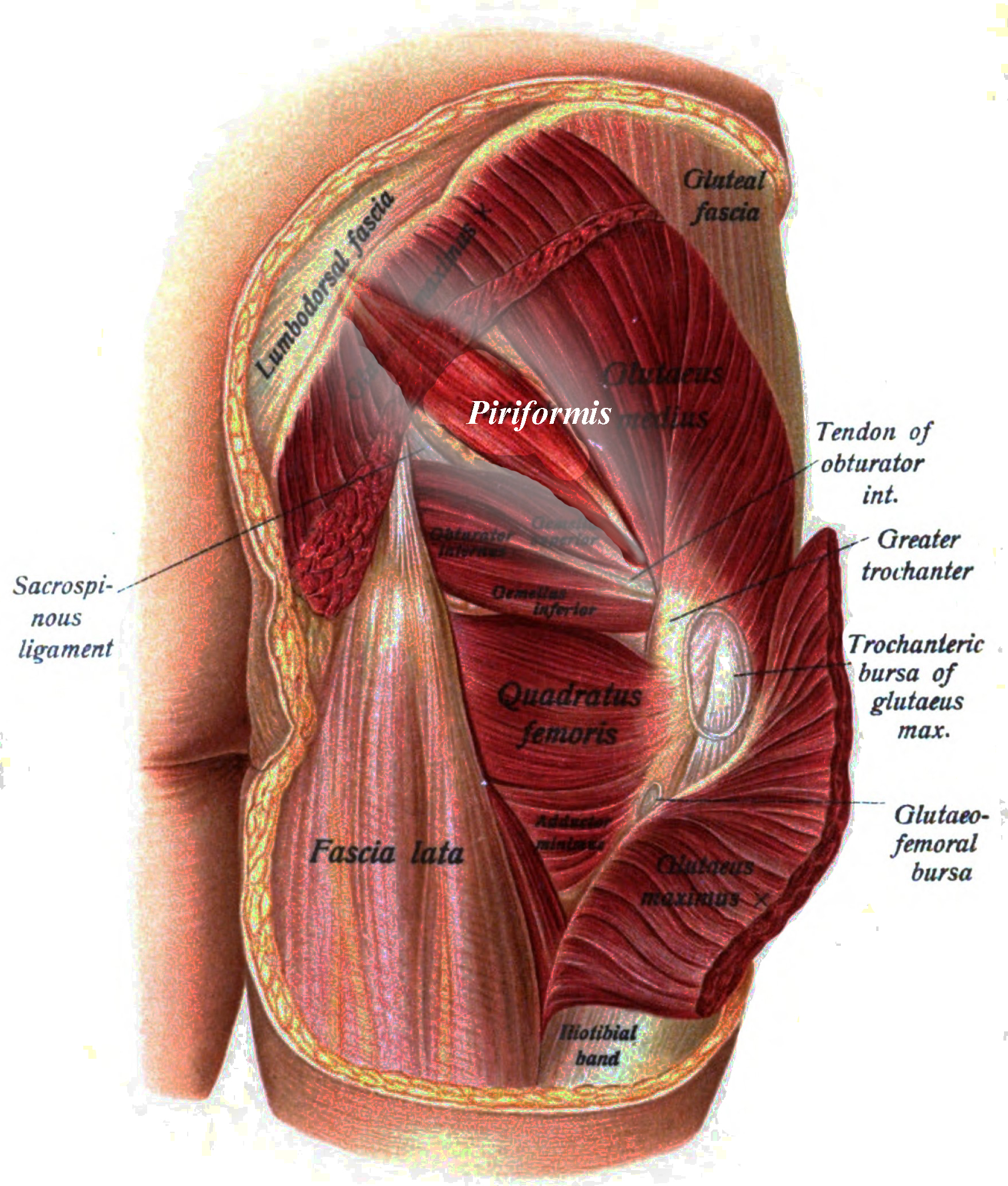
- Buttocks seen from behind (the piriformis and the rest of the lateral rotator group are visible)

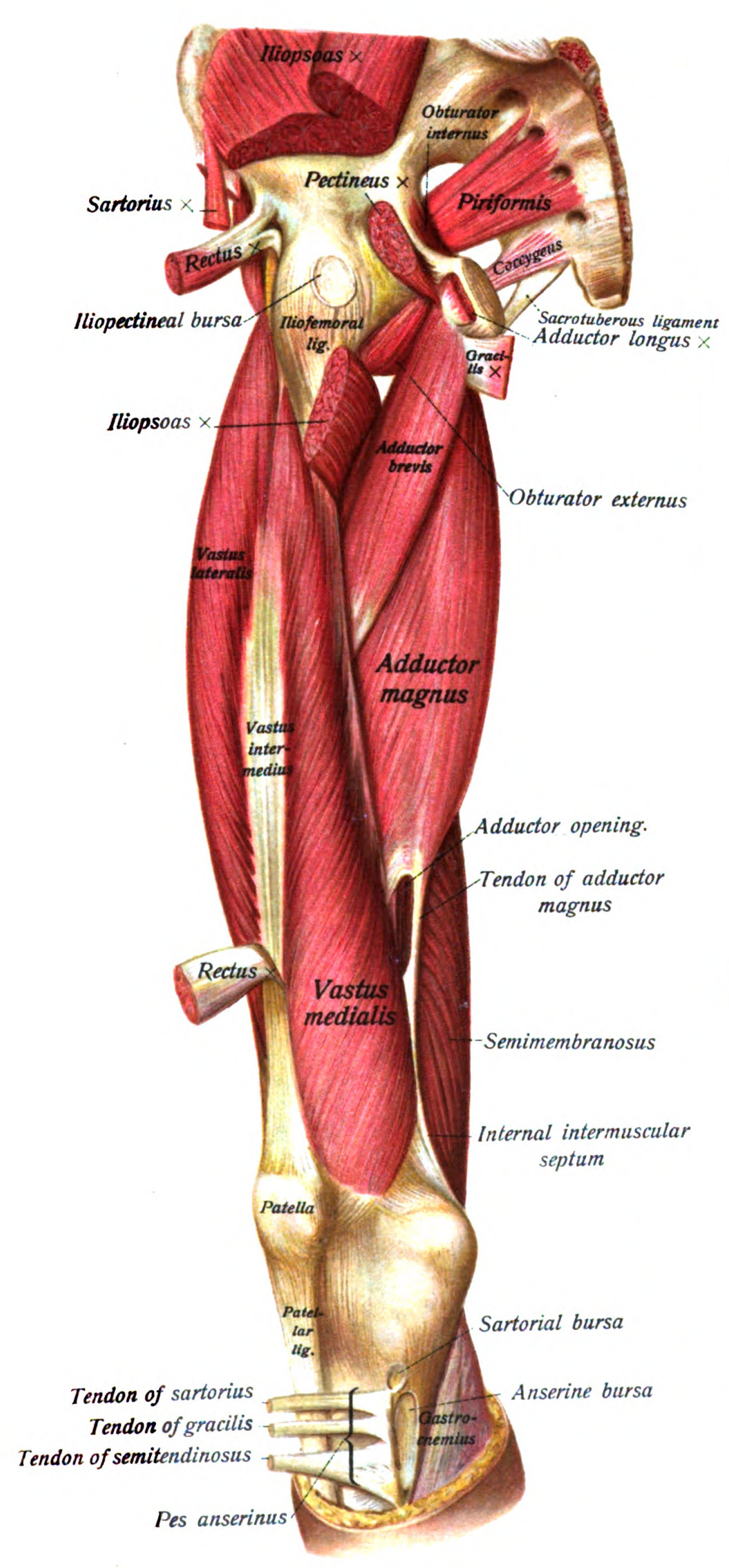
- Muscles of the gluteal and posterior femoral regions seen from the front

Details
- Origin: Sacrum
- Insertion: Greater trochanter
- Artery: Inferior gluteal, lateral sacral and superior gluteal artery,
- Nerve: Nerve to the piriformis (L5, S1, and S2)
- Actions: External rotator of the thigh

Identifiers
- Latin: musculus piriformis
- TA98: A04.7.02.011
- TA2: 2604
- FMA: 19082

The piriformis muscle (from Latin piriformis 'pear-shaped') is a flat, pyramidally-shaped muscle in the gluteal region of the lower limbs. It is one of the six muscles in the lateral rotator group.

The piriformis muscle has its origin upon the front surface of the sacrum, and inserts onto the greater trochanter of the femur. Depending upon the given position of the leg, it acts either as external (lateral) rotator of the thigh or as abductor of the thigh. It is innervated by the piriformis nerve. It is the key muscle of the gluteal region.

== Structure ==
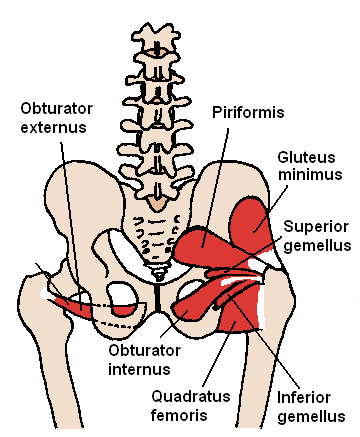
Pelvis seen from behind (the piriformis and the rest of the lateral rotator group are visible).

The piriformis is a flat muscle, and is pyramidal in shape.

=== Origin ===
The piriformis muscle originates from the anterior (front) surface of the sacrum by three fleshy digitations attached to the second, third, and fourth sacral vertebrae.

It also arises from the superior margin of the greater sciatic notch, the gluteal surface of the ilium (near the posterior inferior iliac spine), the sacroiliac joint capsule, and (sometimes) the sacrotuberous ligament (more specifically, the superior part of the pelvic surface of this ligament).

=== Insertion ===
The muscle inserts onto the greater trochanter of the femur (its tendon unites with the tendons of the superior gemellus, inferior gemellus, and obturator internus muscles prior to insertion).

=== Innervation ===
The piriformis muscle is innervated by the piriformis nerve.

=== Relations ===
The posterior aspect of the muscle lies against the sacrum. The anterior surface of the muscle is related to the rectum (especially on the left side of the body), and the sacral plexus.

The muscle lies almost parallel with the posterior margin of the gluteus medius. It is situated partly within the pelvis against its posterior wall, and partly at the back of the hip joint.

It exits the pelvis through the greater sciatic foramen superior to the sacrospinous ligament.

=== Variation ===
In around 80% of the population, the sciatic nerve travels below the piriformis muscle. In 17% of people, the piriformis muscle is pierced by parts or all of the sciatic nerve. Several variations occur, one of which is the rarely found Beaton's type-b in which the sciatic nerve divides between and below the piriformis.

It may be united with the gluteus medius, send fibers to the gluteus minimus, or receive fibers from the superior gemellus.

It may have one or two sacral attachments; or it may be inserted into the capsule of the hip joint.

== Function ==
The piriformis muscle is one of the lateral rotators of the hip, along with the quadratus femoris, gemellus inferior, gemellus superior, obturator externus, and obturator internus. The piriformis laterally rotates the femur with hip extension and abducts the femur with hip flexion. Abduction of the flexed thigh is important in the action of walking because it shifts the body weight to the opposite side of the foot being lifted, which prevents falling. The action of the lateral rotators can be understood by crossing the legs to rest an ankle on the knee of the other leg. This causes the femur to rotate and point the knee laterally. The lateral rotators also oppose medial rotation by the gluteus medius and gluteus minimus. When the hip is flexed to 90 degrees, piriformis abducts the femur at the hip and reverses primary function, internally rotating the hip when the hip is flexed at 90 degrees or more.

== Clinical significance ==
=== Piriformis syndrome ===
Piriformis syndrome occurs when the piriformis irritates the sciatic nerve, which enters the gluteal region beneath the muscle, causing pain in the buttocks and referred pain along the sciatic nerve. This referred pain is known as sciatica. The sciatic nerve runs through the piriformis muscle in seventeen percent of the population; this subgroup of the population is predisposed to developing sciatica. Sciatica is characterized by pain, tingling, or numbness deep in the buttocks and along the sciatic nerve. Sitting down, stretching, climbing stairs, and performing squats usually increases the pain. Diagnosis of the syndrome is usually based on symptoms and on a physical exam. More testing, including MRIs, X-rays, and nerve conduction tests can be administered to exclude other possibilities pathologies. After a diagnosis of piriformis syndrome, the first treatment involves progressive stretching exercises, massage therapy (including neuromuscular therapy), and physical treatment. Corticosteroids can be injected into the piriformis muscle if pain continues.

=== Landmark ===
The piriformis is a very important landmark in the gluteal region. As it travels through the greater sciatic foramen, it effectively divides the region into inferior and superior portions.

This division determines the names of certain vessels and nerves in the region, i.e., the nerve and vessels that emerge superior to the piriformis are known as the superior gluteal nerve and the superior gluteal vessels, while those that emerge below the piriformis are the inferior nerve and vessels.

== History ==
The piriformis muscle was first named by Adriaan van den Spiegel, a professor from the University of Padua in the 16th century.

== Additional images ==
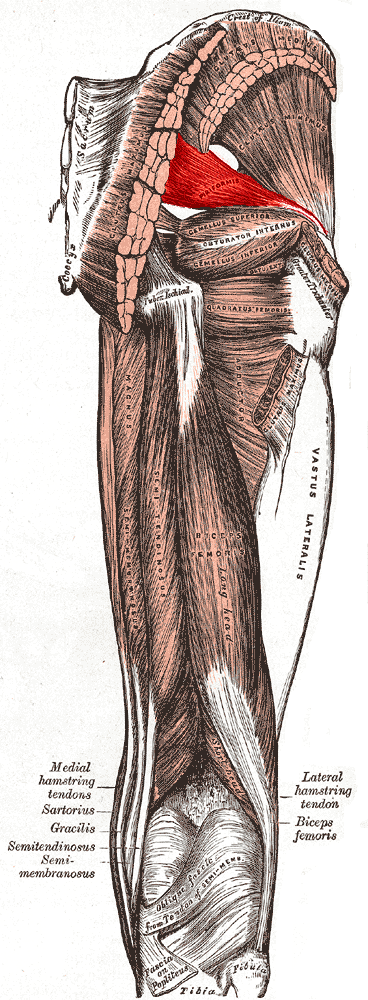
Muscles of the gluteal and posterior femoral regions

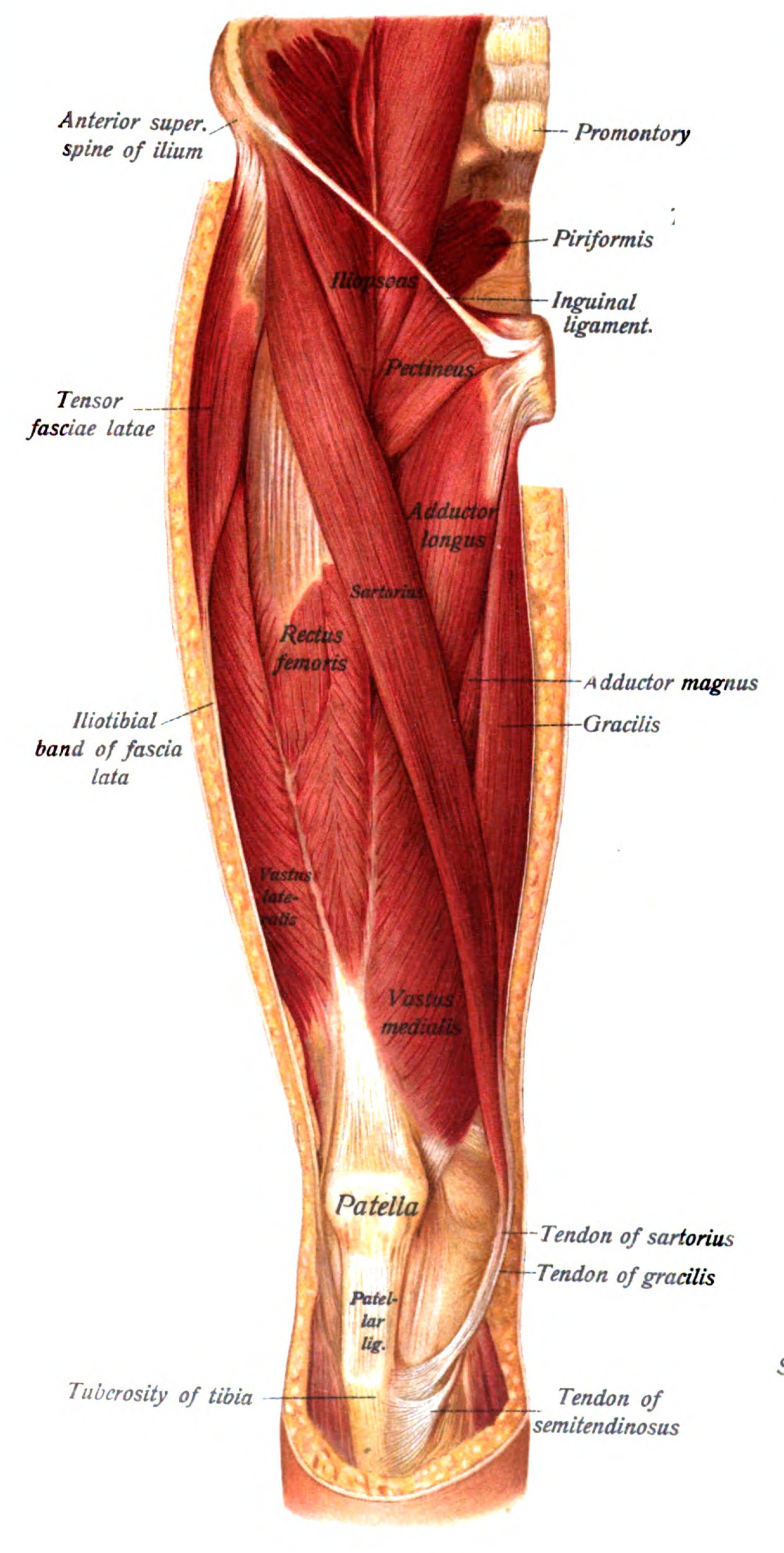

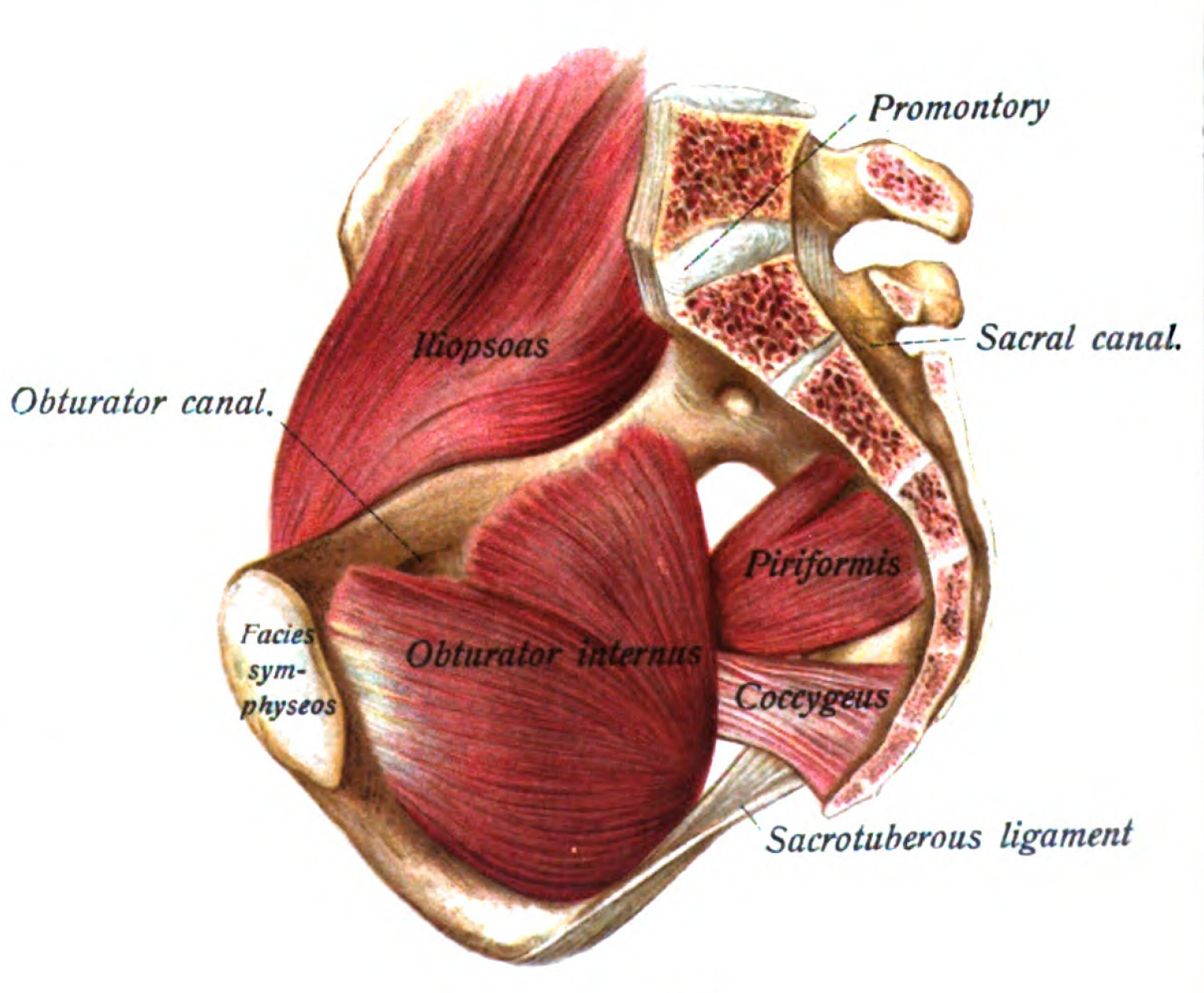

== See also ==
- Piriformis syndrome
- Deep gluteal syndrome
- Lateral rotators of the hip
- Piriformis nerve
- Greater sciatic foramen
- Sacrum
- Greater trochanter
