= Gluteus minimus =

Smallest of the three gluteal muscles

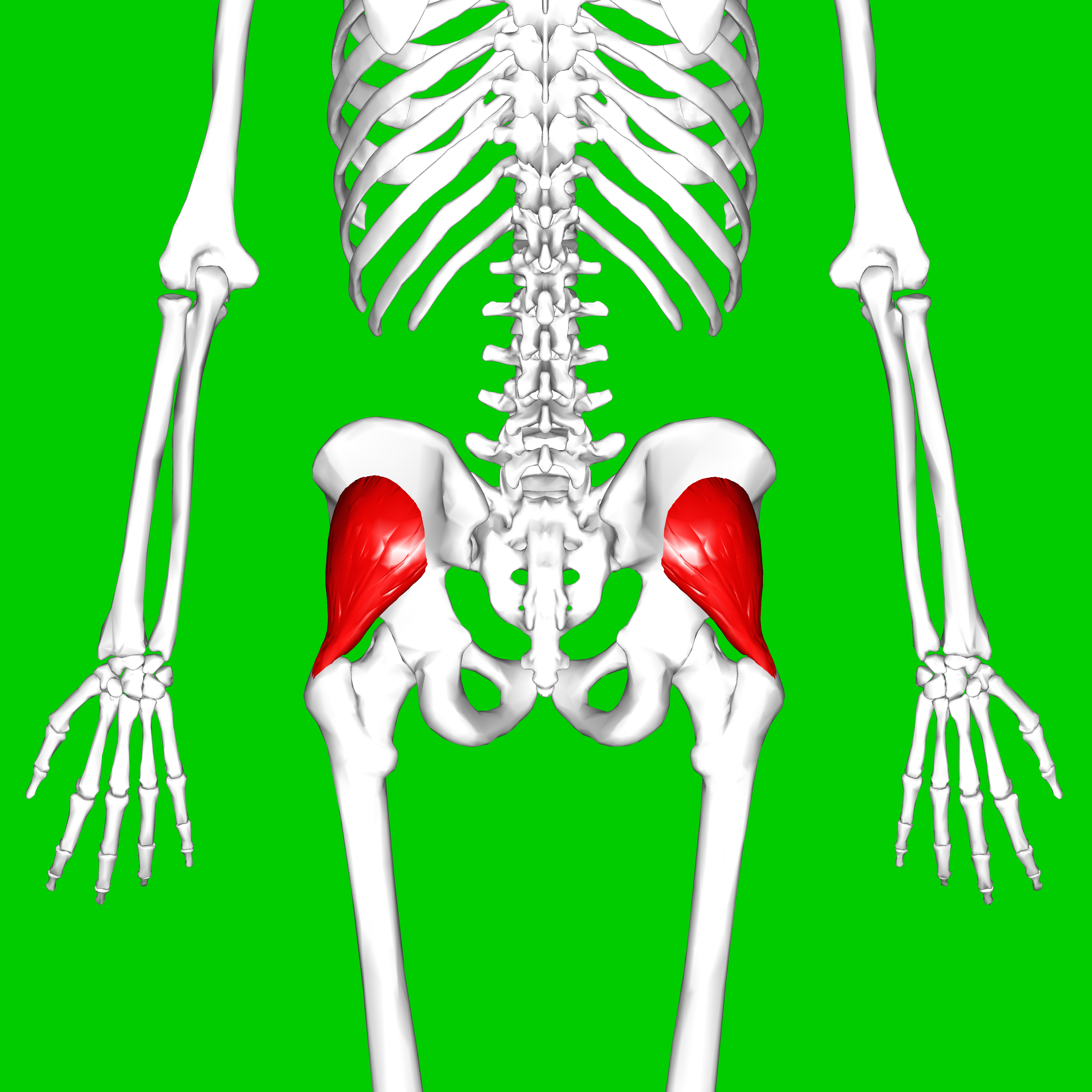
- Gluteus minimus muscle (shown in red). Posterior view.

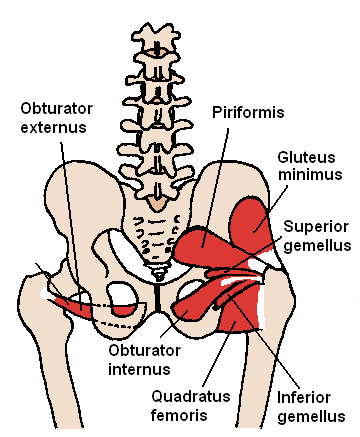
- The gluteus minimus and nearby small gluteal muscles (posterior view)

Details
- Origin: From area in between the anterior gluteal line and inferior gluteal line of gluteal surface ilium, under gluteus medius.
- Insertion: Greater trochanter of the femur
- Artery: Superior gluteal artery
- Nerve: Superior gluteal nerve (L4, L5, S1 nerve roots)
- Actions: Works in concert with gluteus medius: abduction of the hip; preventing adduction of the hip. Medial rotation of thigh.
- Antagonist: Lateral rotator group

Identifiers
- Latin: musculus glutaeus minimus
- TA98: A04.7.02.008
- TA2: 2600
- FMA: 22317

The gluteus minimus, or glutæus minimus, the smallest of the three gluteal muscles, is situated immediately beneath the gluteus medius.

== Structure ==
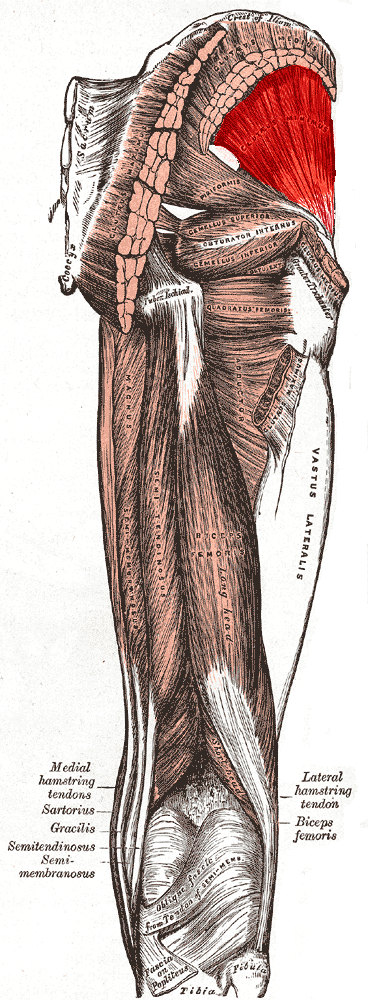
Muscles of the gluteal and posterior femoral regions with gluteus minimus muscle highlighted.

It is fan-shaped, arising from the outer surface of the ilium, between the anterior and inferior gluteal lines, and behind, from the margin of the greater sciatic notch.

The fibers converge to the deep surface of a radiated aponeurosis, and this ends in a tendon which is inserted into an impression on the anterior border of the greater trochanter, and gives an expansion to the capsule of the hip joint.

=== Relations ===
A bursa is interposed between the tendon and the greater trochanter.

Between the gluteus medius and gluteus minimus are the deep branches of the superior gluteal vessels and the superior gluteal nerve.

The deep surface of the gluteus minimus is in relation with the reflected tendon of the rectus femoris and the capsule of the hip joint.

=== Variations ===
The muscle may be divided into an anterior and a posterior part, or it may send slips to the piriformis, the superior gemellus or the outer part of the origin of the vastus lateralis.

== Function ==
The gluteus medius and gluteus minimus abduct the thigh, when the limb is extended, and are principally called into action in supporting the body on one limb, in conjunction with the tensor fasciæ latæ.

Their anterior fibers also flex the hip, and by drawing the greater trochanter forward, rotate the thigh inward, in which action they are also assisted by the Tensor fasciæ latæ.

Both gluteus minimus and medius have the same function. Their primary function is abduction of the femur, while internal rotation and flexion can occur depending on the position of the femur. Additionally, with the hip flexed, the gluteus minimus internally rotates the thigh. With the hip extended, gluteus minimus externally rotates the thigh.

It is also a local stabilizer for the hip. The attachment to the superior capsule of the hip may also serve to retract the capsule away from the joint during motion. This mechanism may prevent capsular impingement similar to the role of the articularis genus in the knee.

== Clinical significance ==
Paralysis of this muscle or gluteus medius, such as may be caused by the superior gluteal nerve palsy, can lead to difficulty abducting the leg. People will compensate for their difficulty walking by adopting a Trendelenburg gait.

== Additional images ==
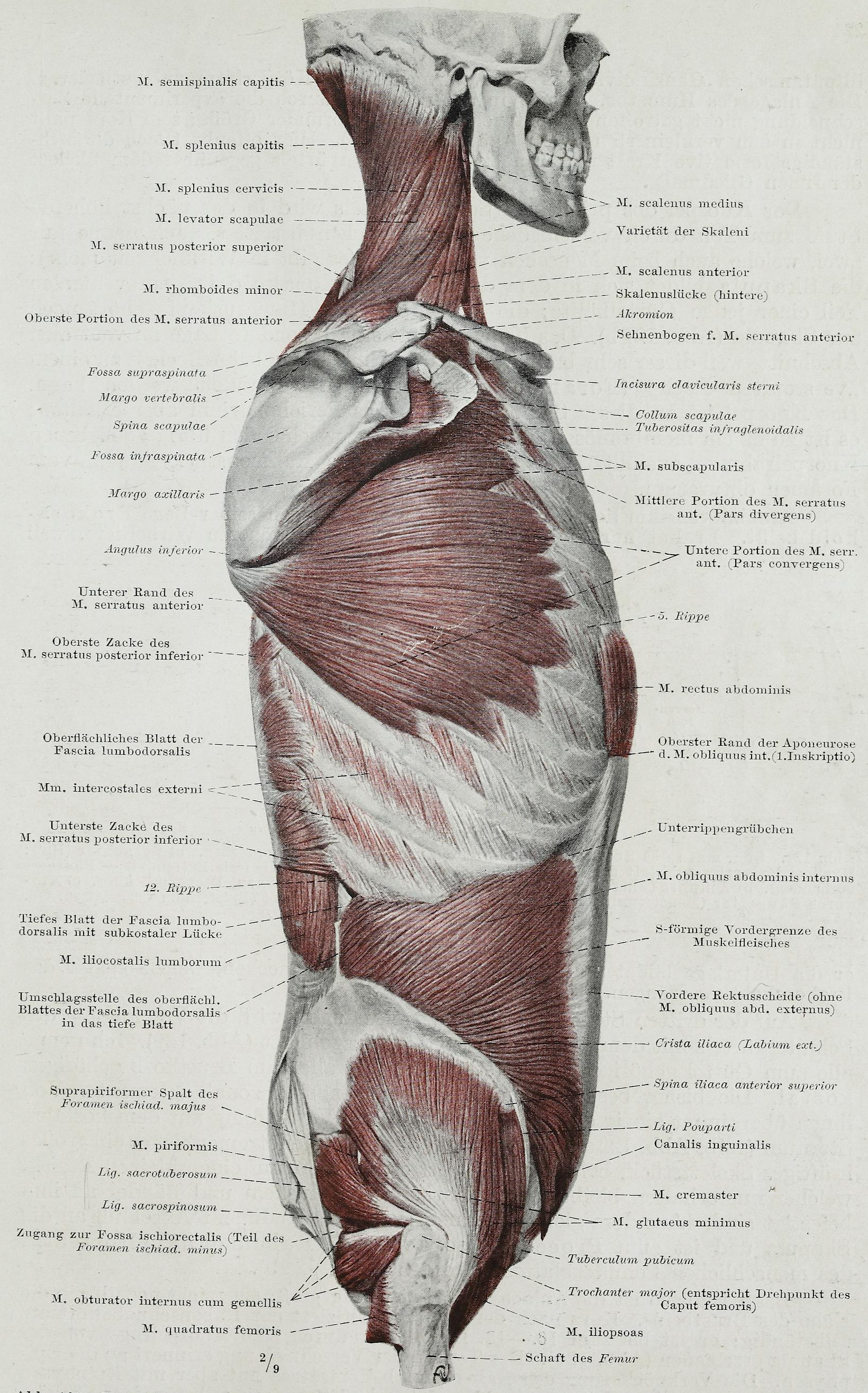

Position of gluteus minimus muscle (shown in red). Hip bone is shown in semi-transparent. Note that the animation shows lateral-posterior insertion of the muscle in the greater trochanter, while the typical insertion point is in its anterior aspect (as shown in all the other illustrations).

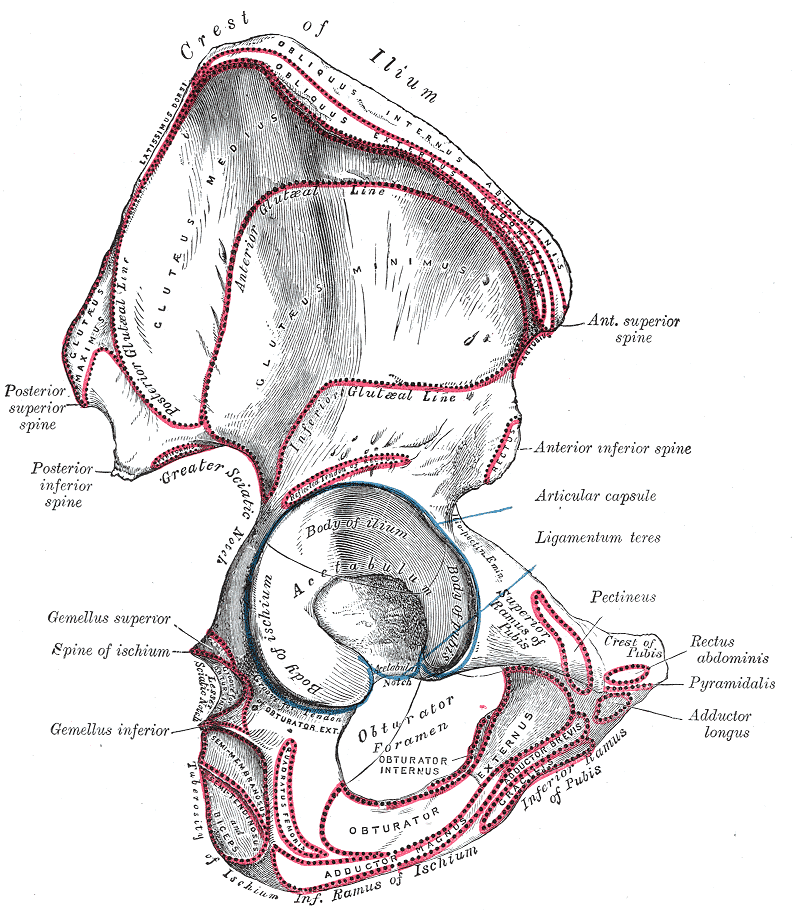
Right hip bone. External surface.

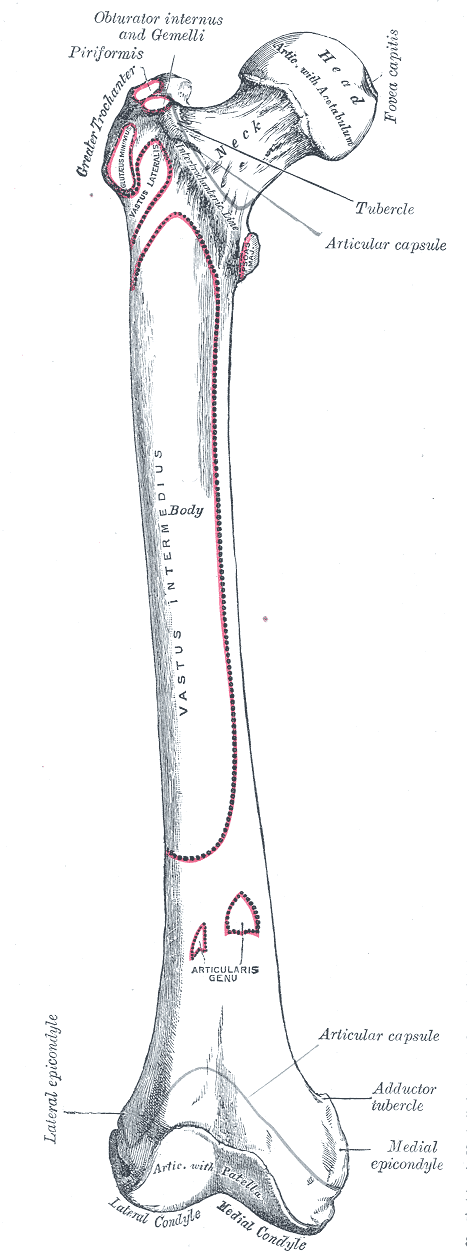
Right femur. Anterior surface.

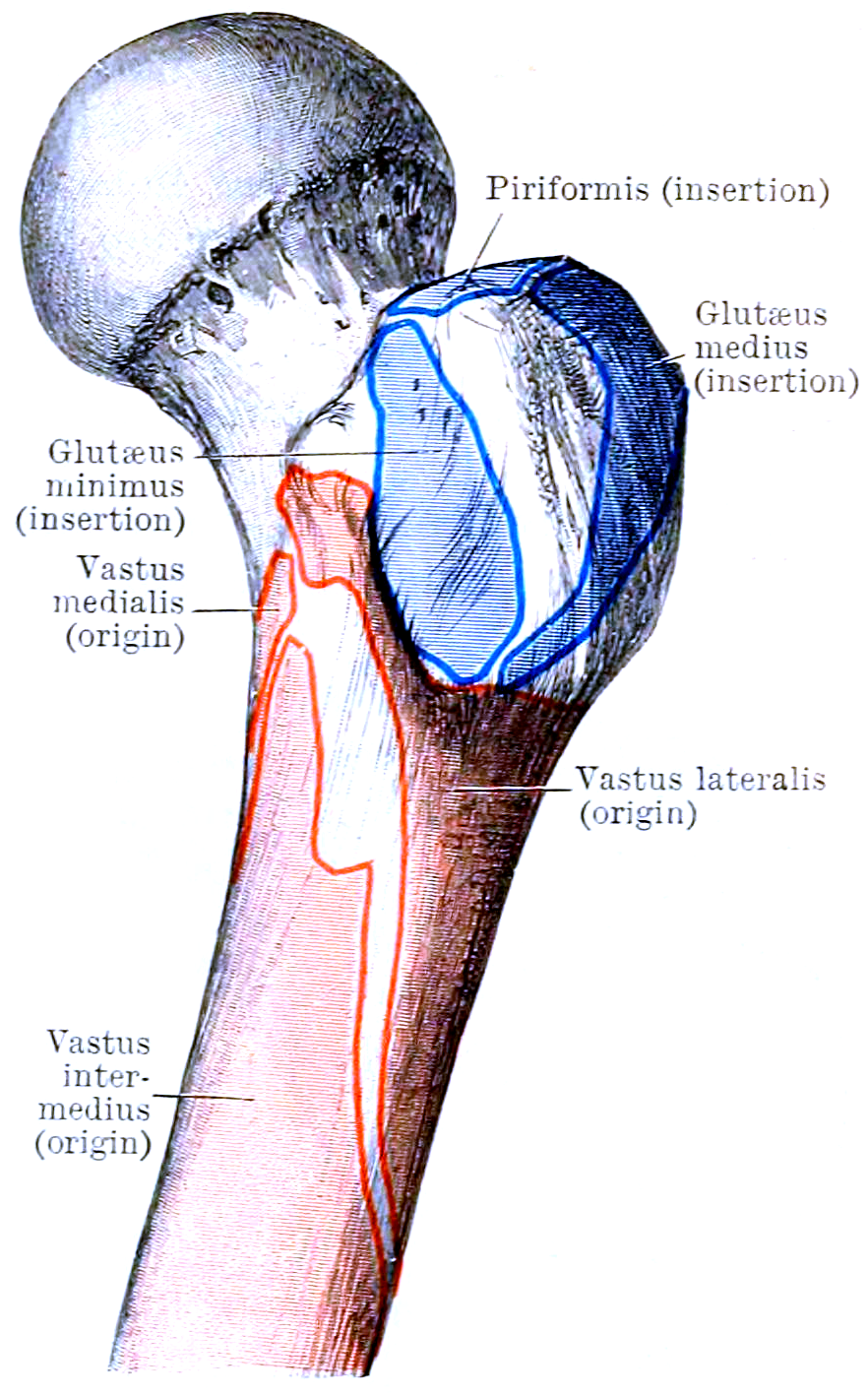
Insertion at the greater trochanter.

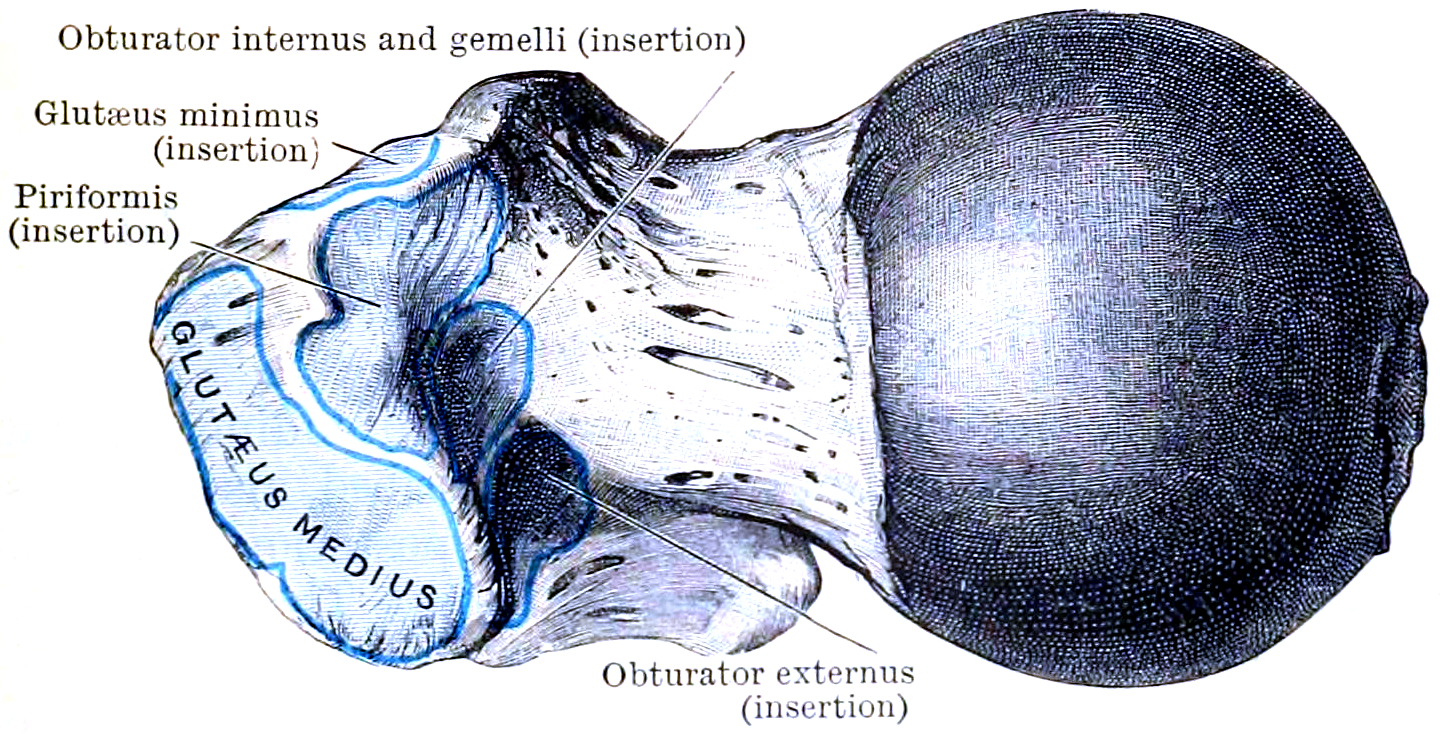
Insertion at the greater trochanter.

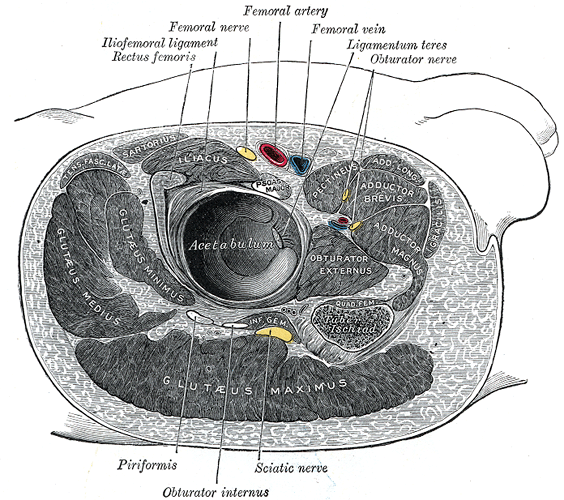
Structures surrounding right hip-joint. (Gluteus minimus visible at center left.)

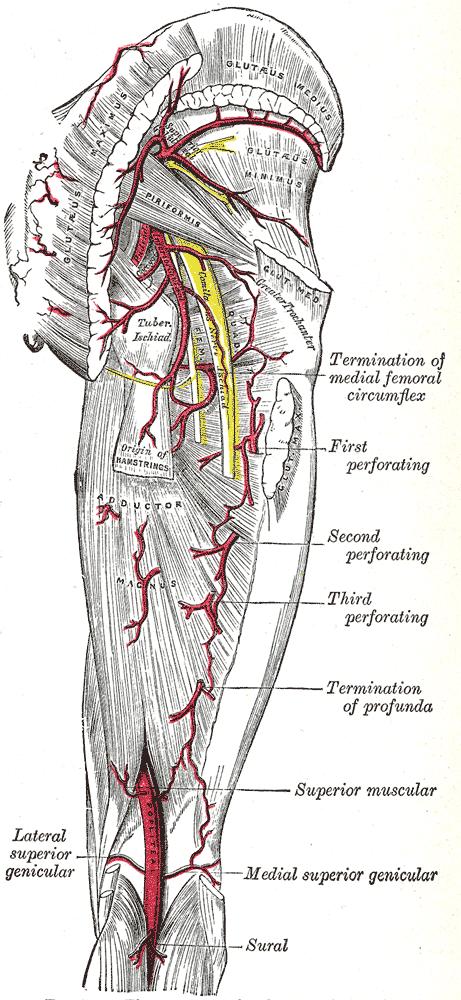
The arteries of the gluteal and posterior femoral regions.

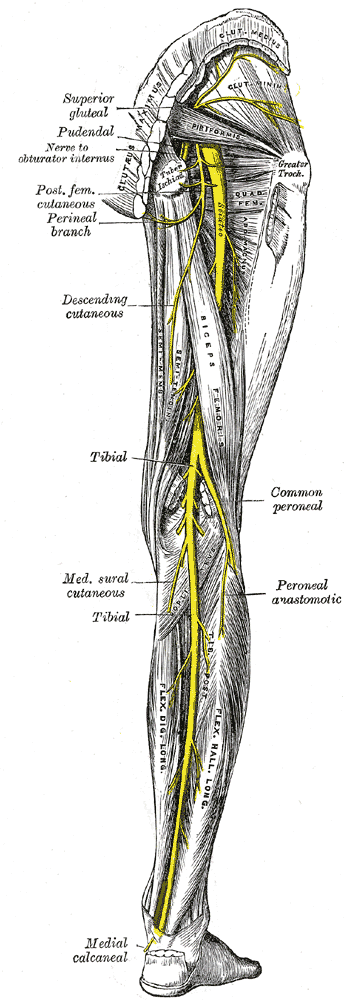
Nerves of the right lower extremity Posterior view.
