= Greater trochanter =

Quadrilateral part of the thigh bone

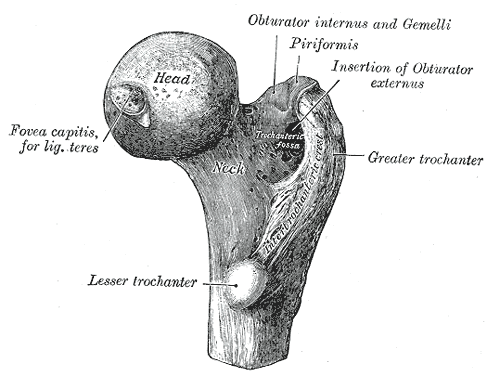
- Upper extremity of right femur viewed from behind and above.

Details
- Origins: Vastus lateralis
- Insertions: Obturator internus, gemelli, piriformis, gluteus minimus, gluteus medius

Identifiers
- Latin: trochanter major
- TA98: A02.5.04.005
- TA2: 1364
- FMA: 32852

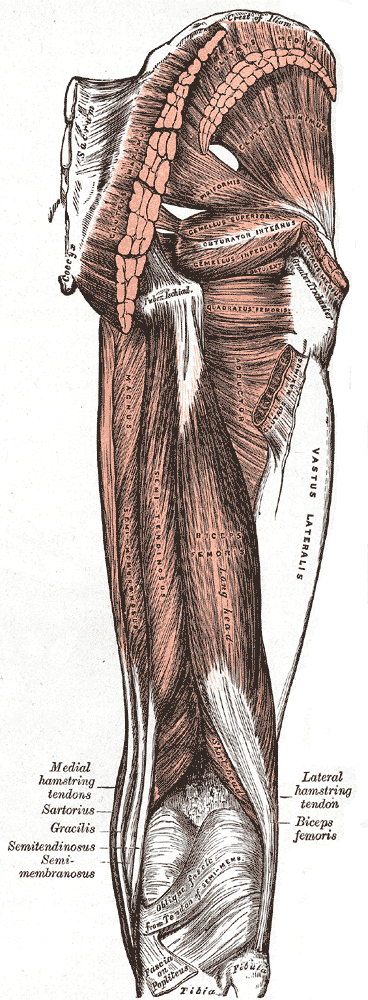
Same point of view as above of right femur from behind. Greater trochanter is labeled at right.

The greater trochanter of the femur, historically known as trochanter major, is a large, irregular, quadrilateral eminence and a part of the skeletal system.

It is directed lateral and medially and slightly posterior. In the adult it is about 2–4 cm lower than the femoral head. Because the pelvic outlet in the female is larger than in the male, there is a greater distance between the greater trochanters in the female.

It has two surfaces and four borders. It is a traction epiphysis.

== Surfaces ==
The lateral surface, quadrilateral in form, is broad, rough, convex, and marked by a diagonal impression, which extends from the postero-superior to the antero-inferior angle, and serves for the insertion of the tendon of the gluteus medius.

Above the impression is a triangular surface, sometimes rough for part of the tendon of the same muscle, sometimes smooth for the interposition of a bursa between the tendon and the bone. Below and behind the diagonal impression is a smooth triangular surface, over which the tendon of the gluteus maximus lies, a bursa being interposed.

The medial surface, of much less extent than the lateral, presents at its base a deep depression, the trochanteric fossa (digital fossa), for the insertion of the tendon of the obturator externus, and above and in front of this an impression for the insertion of the obturator internus and superior and inferior gemellus muscles.

== Borders ==
The superior border is free; it is thick and irregular, and marked near the center by an impression for the insertion of the piriformis.

The inferior border corresponds to the line of junction of the base of the trochanter with the lateral surface of the body; it is marked by a rough, prominent, slightly curved ridge, which gives origin to the upper part of the vastus lateralis.

The anterior border is prominent and somewhat irregular; it affords insertion at its lateral part to the gluteus minimus.

The posterior border is very prominent and appears as a free, rounded edge, which bounds the back part of the trochanteric fossa.

== Additional images ==
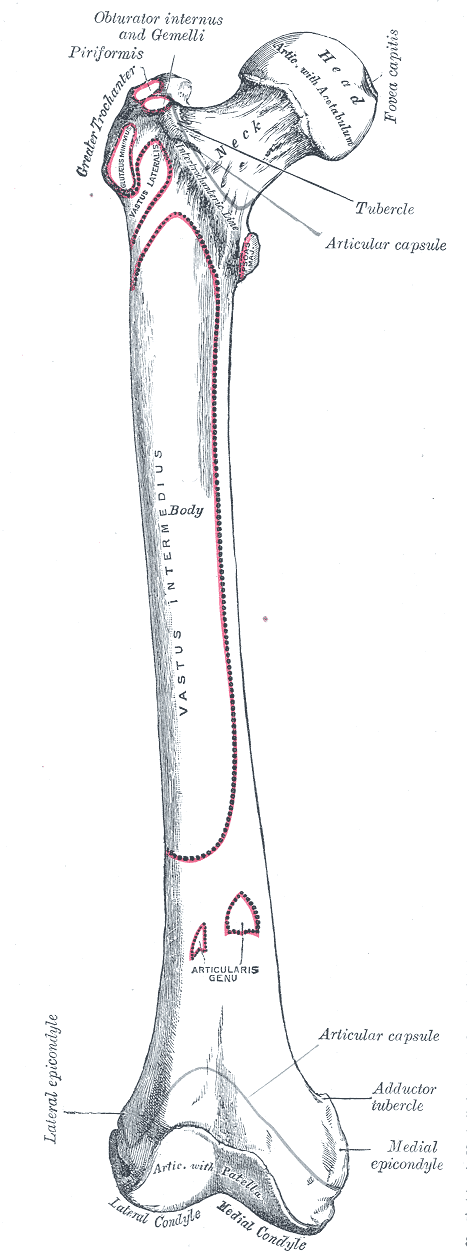
Right femur. Anterior surface.

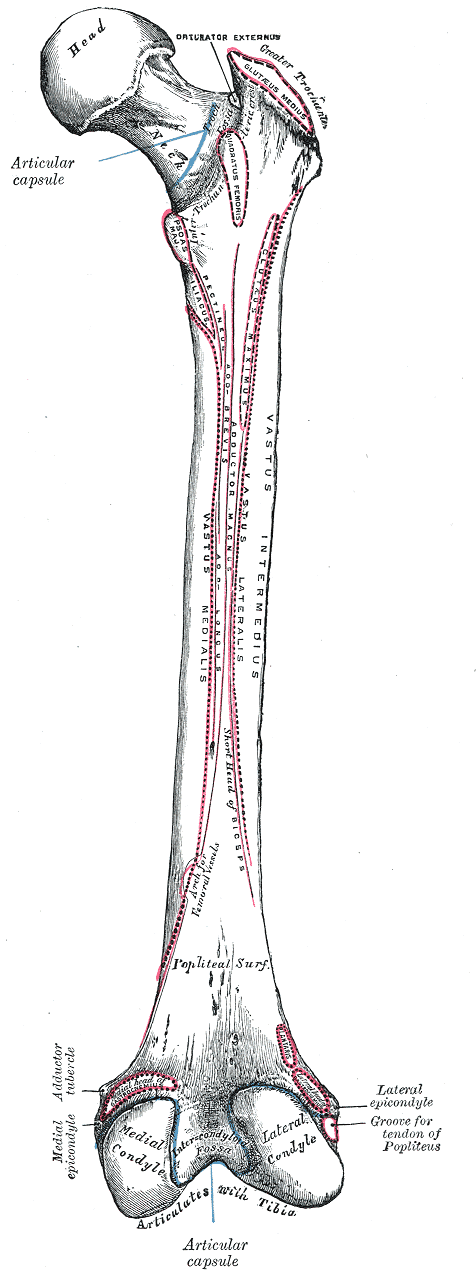
Right femur. Posterior surface.

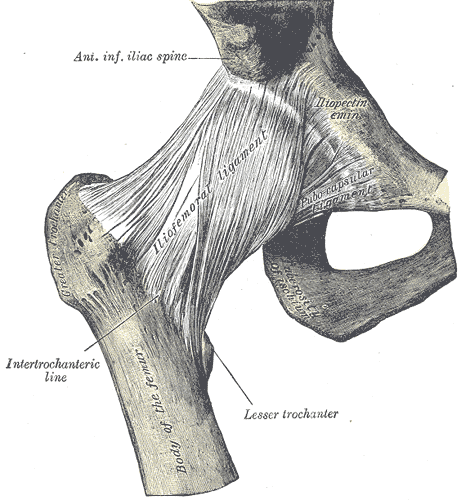
Right hip-joint from the front.

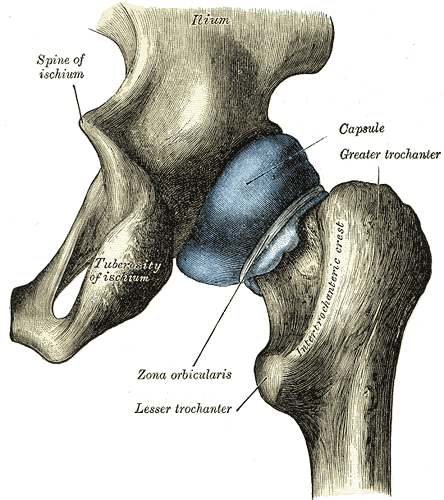
Capsule of hip-joint (distended). Posterior aspect.

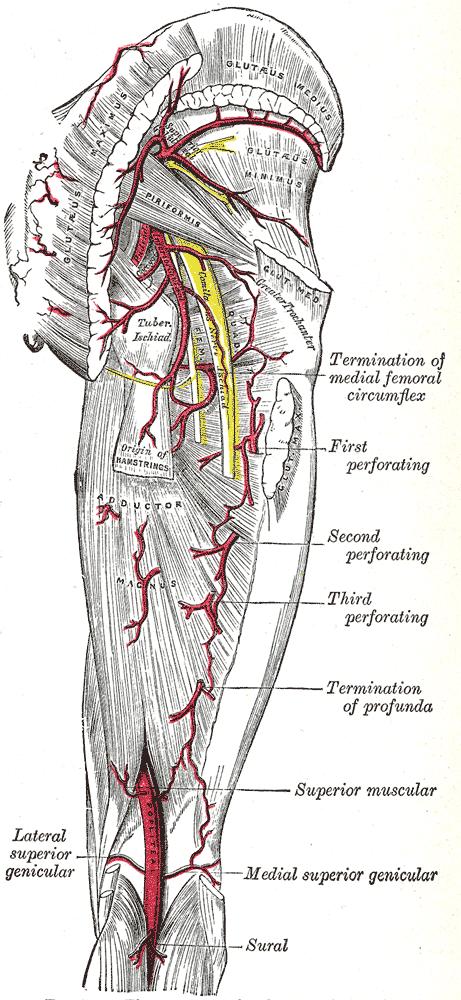
The arteries of the gluteal and posterior femoral regions.

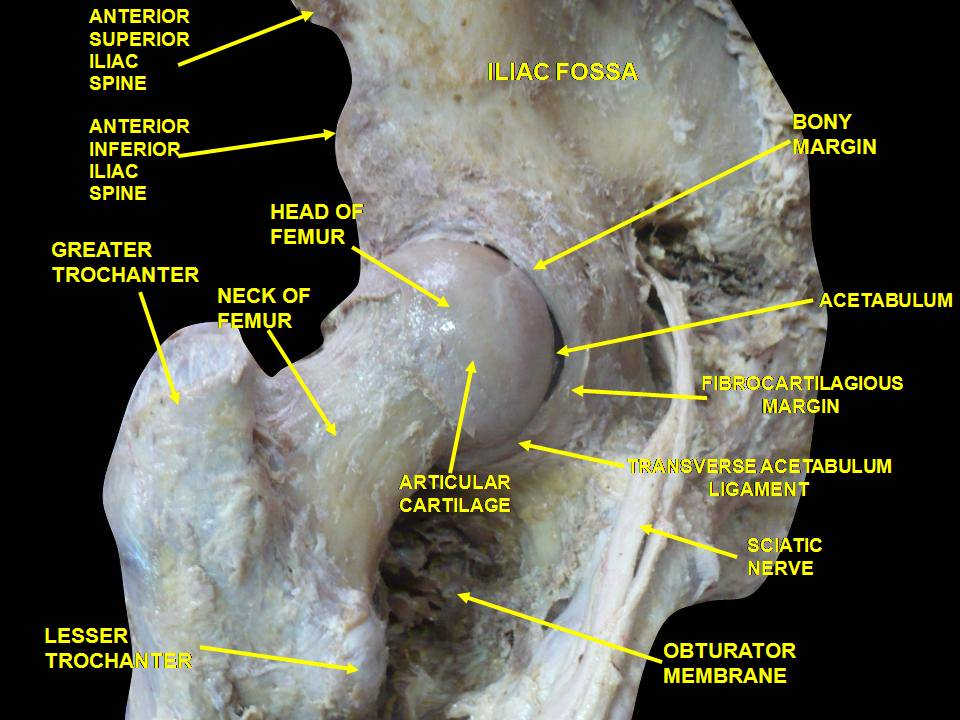
Hip joint. Lateral view. Greater trochanter.

== See also ==
- Third trochanter
