= Internal obturator muscle =

One of six small hip muscles in the lateral rotator group

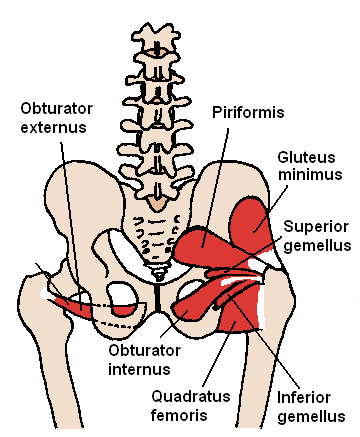
- The obturator internus and nearby muscles (posterior view)

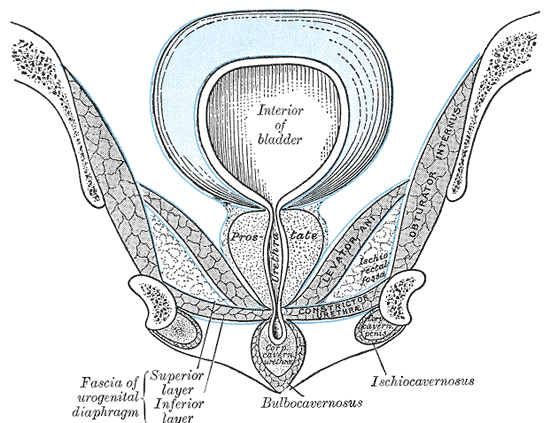
- Coronal section of anterior part of pelvis, through the pubic arch. Seen from in front. (Obturator internus labeled at right.)

Details
- Origin: Ischiopubic ramus and obturator membrane
- Insertion: Medial aspect of the greater trochanter
- Artery: Inferior gluteal artery
- Nerve: Nerve to obturator internus (L5, S1, S2)
- Actions: Abducts and laterally rotates the extended hip and abducts the flexed thigh at the hip, and stabilizes the hip during walking

Identifiers
- Latin: musculus obturatorius internus
- TA98: A04.7.02.012
- TA2: 2605
- FMA: 22298

The internal obturator muscle or obturator internus muscle originates on the medial surface of the obturator membrane, the ischium near the membrane, and the rim of the pubis.

It exits the pelvic cavity through the lesser sciatic foramen.

The internal obturator is situated partly within the lesser pelvis, and partly at the back of the hip-joint.

It functions to help laterally rotate femur with hip extension and abduct femur with hip flexion, as well as to steady the femoral head in the acetabulum.

== Structure ==
=== Origin ===
The internal obturator muscle arises from the inner surface of the antero-lateral wall of the pelvis. It surrounds the obturator foramen. It is attached to the inferior pubic ramus and ischium, and at the side to the inner surface of the hip bone below and behind the pelvic brim. It reaches from the upper part of the greater sciatic foramen above and behind to the obturator foramen below and in front.

It also arises from the pelvic surface of the obturator membrane. This is except in the posterior part, from the tendinous arch which completes the canal for the passage of the obturator vessels and nerve, and to a slight extent from the obturator fascia, which covers the muscle.

=== Passage ===
The fibers converge through the lesser sciatic foramen. These end in four or five tendinous bands, which are found on the deep surface of the muscle. These bands are reflected at a right angle over the grooved surface of the ischium between its spine and tuberosity.

The obturator nerve passes on the superficial surface of the internal obturator muscle. The pudendal nerve passes on the lateral surface of the internal obturator muscle and the coccygeus muscle. The sciatic nerve passes superficial to the internal obturator muscle on the posterior surface.

=== Insertion ===
The tendon inserts on the greater trochanter of the proximal femur.

=== Nerve supply ===
The internal obturator muscle is supplied by the obturator internus nerve (L5, S1, and S2).

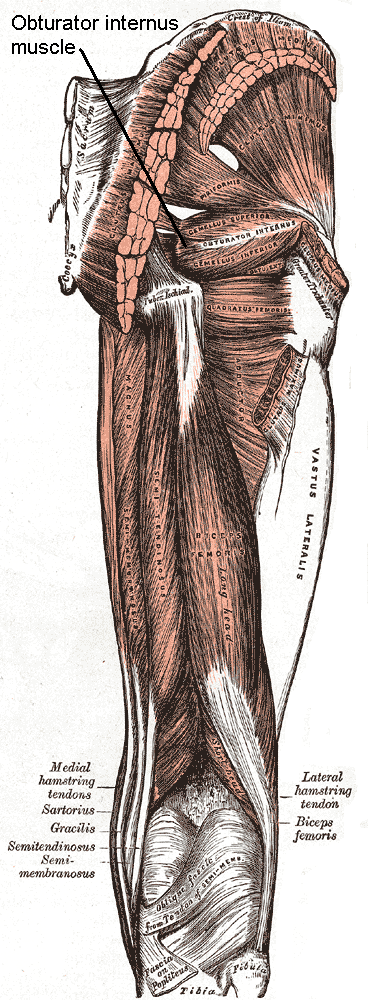
Muscles of the gluteal and posterior femoral regions.

=== Bursa/bands ===
This bony surface is covered by smooth cartilage, which is separated from the tendon by a bursa, and presents one or more ridges corresponding with the furrows between the tendinous bands.

These bands leave the pelvis through the lesser sciatic foramen and unite into a single flattened tendon, which passes horizontally across the capsule of the hip-joint, and, after receiving the attachments of the superior and inferior gemellus muscles, is inserted into the forepart of the medial surface of the greater trochanter above the trochanteric fossa.

A bursa, narrow and elongated in form, is usually found between the tendon and the capsule of the hip-joint. It occasionally communicates with the bursa between the tendon and the ischium.

== Function ==
The internal obturator muscle helps to support the urinary bladder as part of the pelvic floor.

== Additional images ==
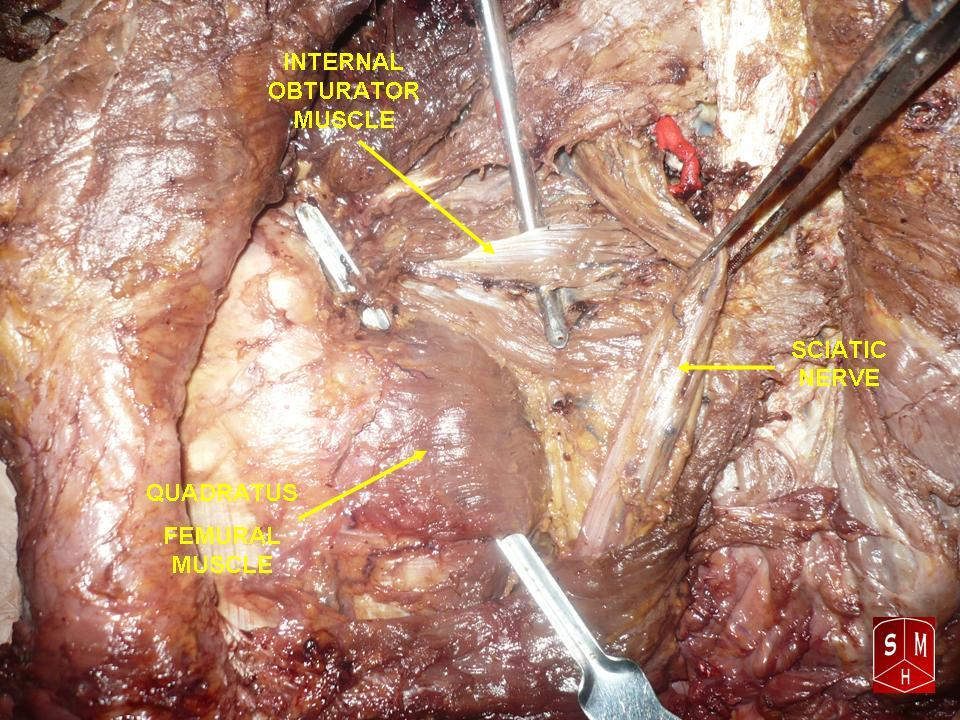
Obturator internus muscle

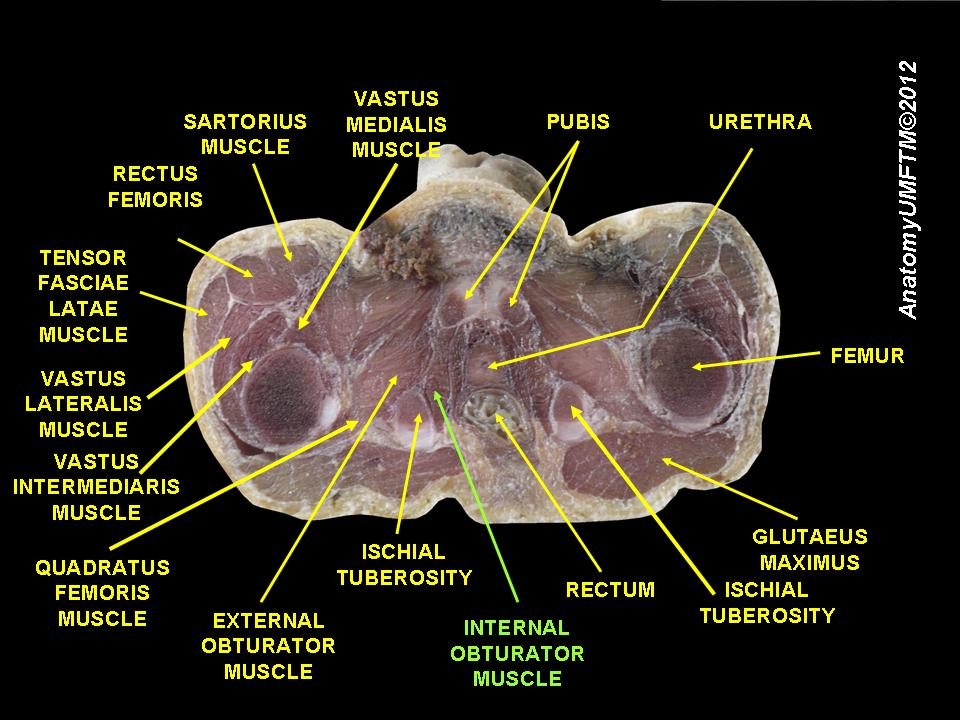
Obturator internus muscle

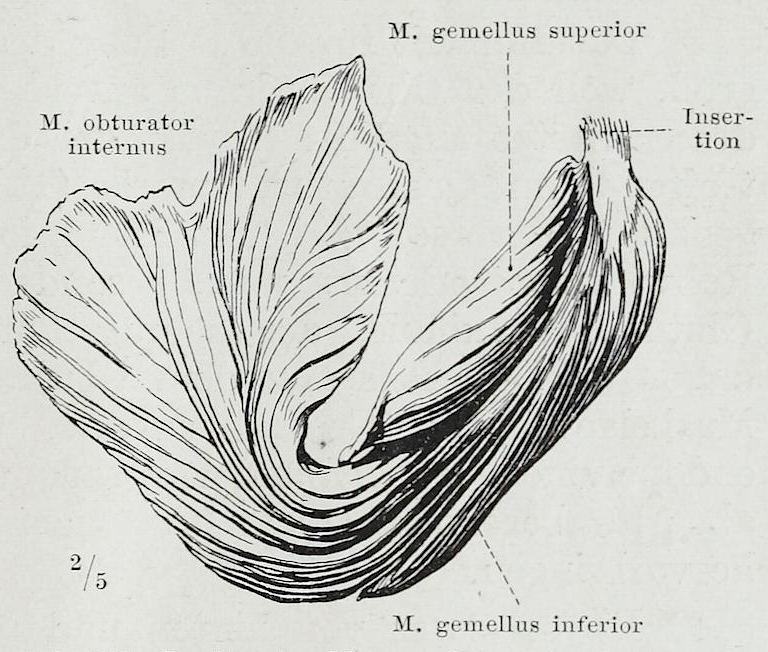
"Triceps coxae"
