= Gluteus medius =

One of the three gluteal muscles

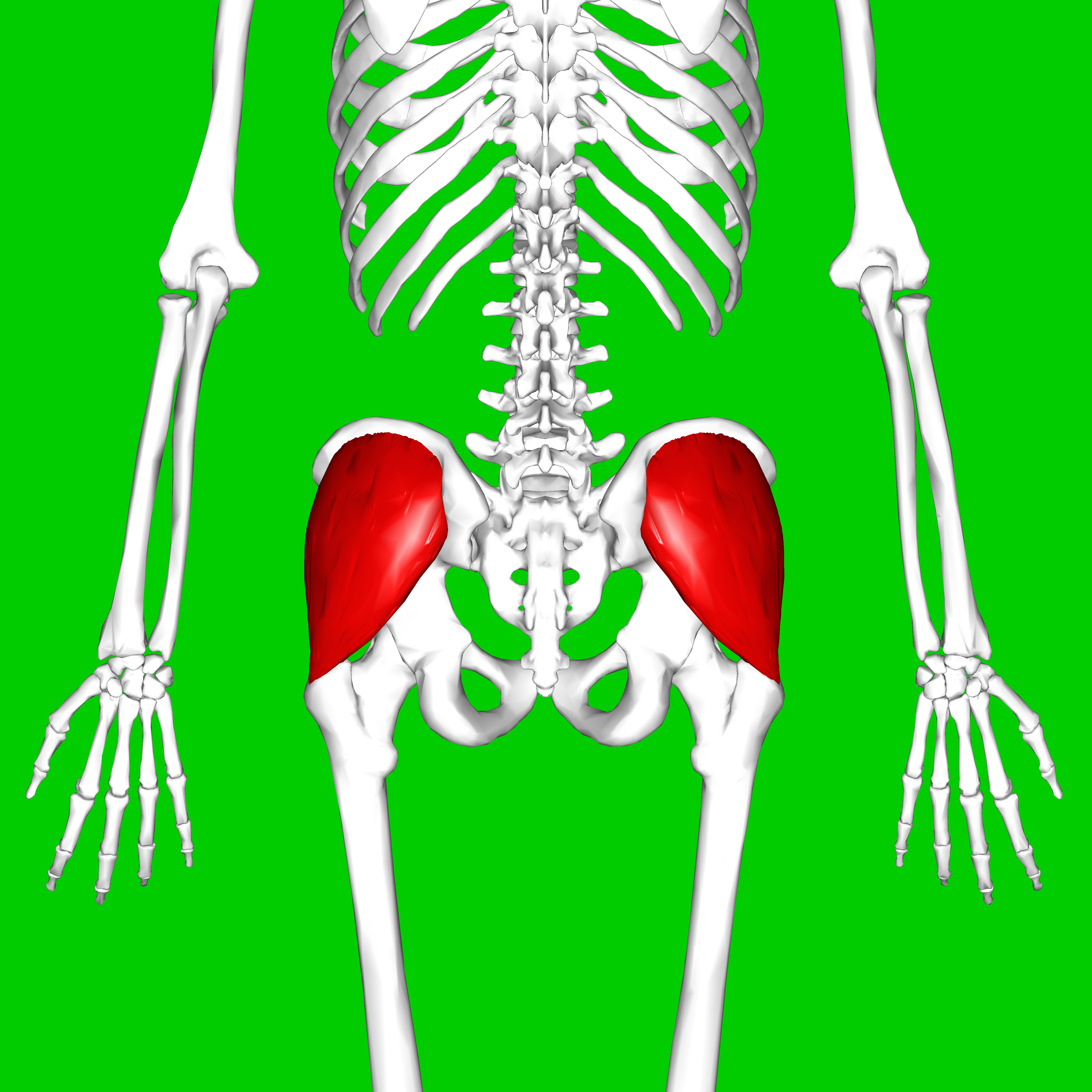
- Position of gluteus medius muscle (shown in red). Posterior view.

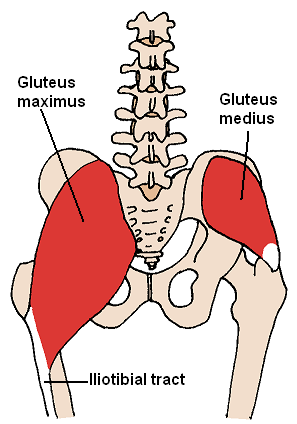
- The gluteus medius and nearby muscles.

Details
- Origin: Gluteal surface of ilium, under gluteus maximus, Aponeurosis glutea
- Insertion: Greater trochanter of the femur
- Artery: Superior gluteal artery
- Nerve: Superior gluteal nerve (L4, L5, S1 nerve roots)
- Actions: Abduction of the hip; preventing adduction of the hip. Medial/internal rotation and flexion of the hip (anterior fibers). Extension and lateral/external rotation of the hip (posterior fibers)
- Antagonist: Adductors

Identifiers
- Latin: musculus glutaeus medius
- TA98: A04.7.02.007
- TA2: 2599
- FMA: 22315

The gluteus medius (or musculus glutaeus medius), one of the three gluteal muscles, is a broad, thick, radiating muscle. It is situated on the outer surface of the pelvis.

Its posterior third is covered by the gluteus maximus, its anterior two-thirds by the gluteal aponeurosis, which separates it from the superficial fascia and integument.

== Structure ==
The gluteus medius muscle starts, or "originates", on the outer surface of the ilium between the iliac crest and the posterior gluteal line above, and the anterior gluteal line below; the gluteus medius also originates from its own fascia, the gluteal aponeurosis, that covers its outer surface.

The fibers of the muscle converge into a strong flattened tendon that inserts on the lateral surface of the greater trochanter. More specifically, the muscle's tendon inserts into an oblique ridge that runs downward and forward on the lateral surface of the greater trochanter. Before the insertion the fibers cross from anterior to posterior and vice versa.

=== Relations ===
A bursa, the Bursa trochanterica m. glutaei medii, separates the tendon of the muscle from the surface of the trochanter over which it glides. The deep surface of the gluteus medius is in relation to the gluteus minimus.

=== Variations ===
The posterior border may be more or less closely united to the piriformis, or some of the fibers end on its tendon.

== Function ==
- The anterior part acting alone helps to flex and internally rotate the hip.
- The posterior part acting alone helps to extend and externally rotate the hip.
- The anterior and posterior parts working together abduct the hip and stabilize the pelvis in the coronal plane.
- Most of the muscle inserts behind the centre of rotation of the hip. However, its function changes in different positions of the femur. For example: If the leg is flexed, the whole muscle will flex.

The posterior fibres of gluteus medius contract to produce hip extension, lateral rotation and abduction. During gait, the posterior fibres help to decelerate internal rotation of the femur at the end of swing phase.

Together with the gluteus minimus and other short pelvi-trochanteric muscles it centers and stabilises the hip. Thus, its preservation and the accurate anatomical reconstruction of the femoral offset and anteversion is of quintessential importance for the result of surgical hip replacement.

== Clinical significance ==
Dysfunction of the gluteus medius or the superior gluteal nerve can potentially be indicated by a positive Trendelenburg's sign.

== Additional images ==
Position of gluteus medius muscle (shown in red). Hip bone is shown in semi-transparent.

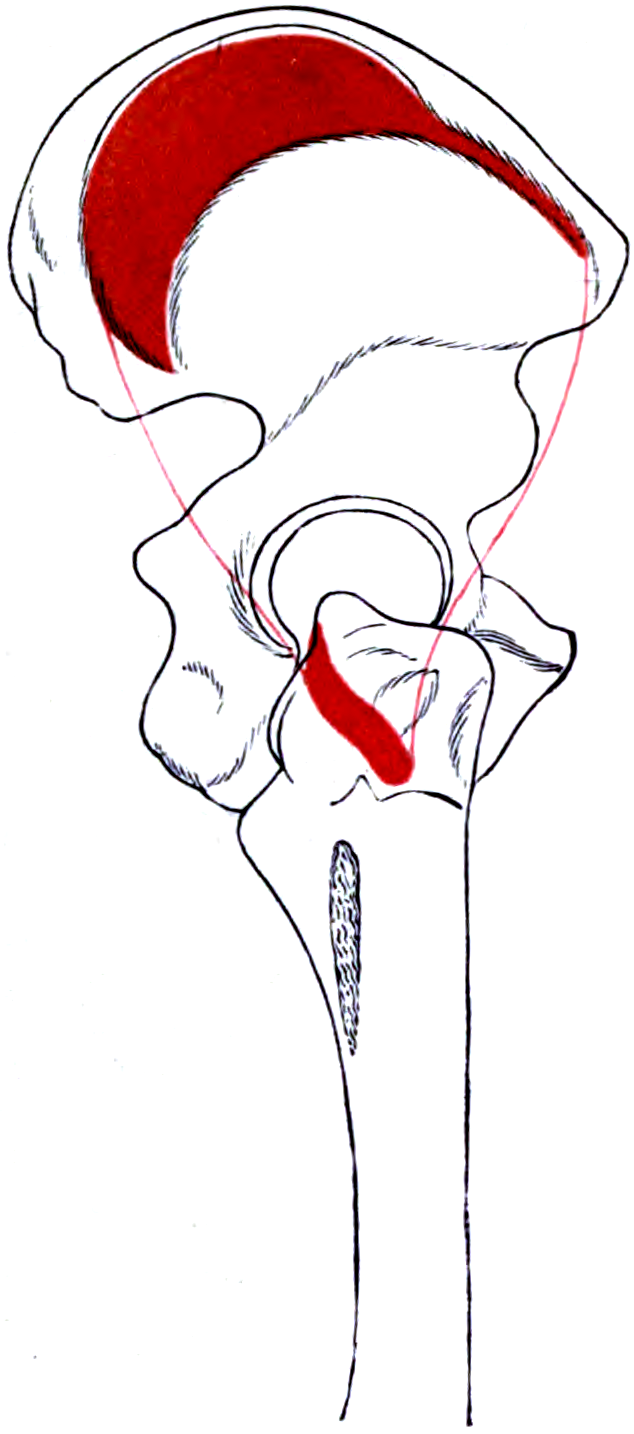
Origin and attachment areas.

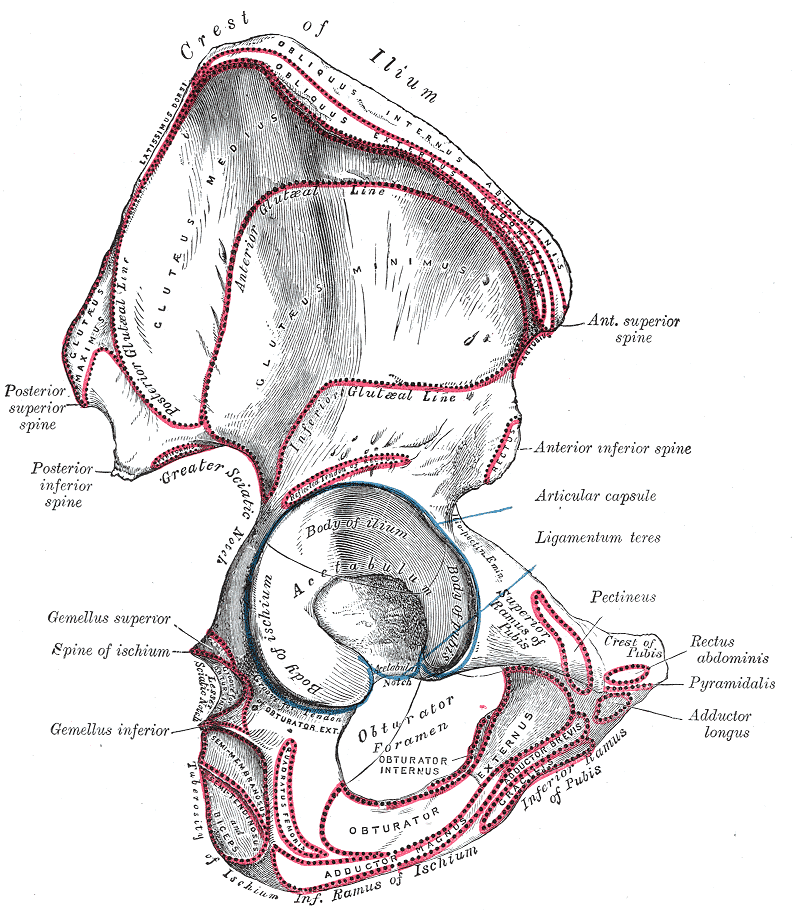
Origin zone at the ilium.

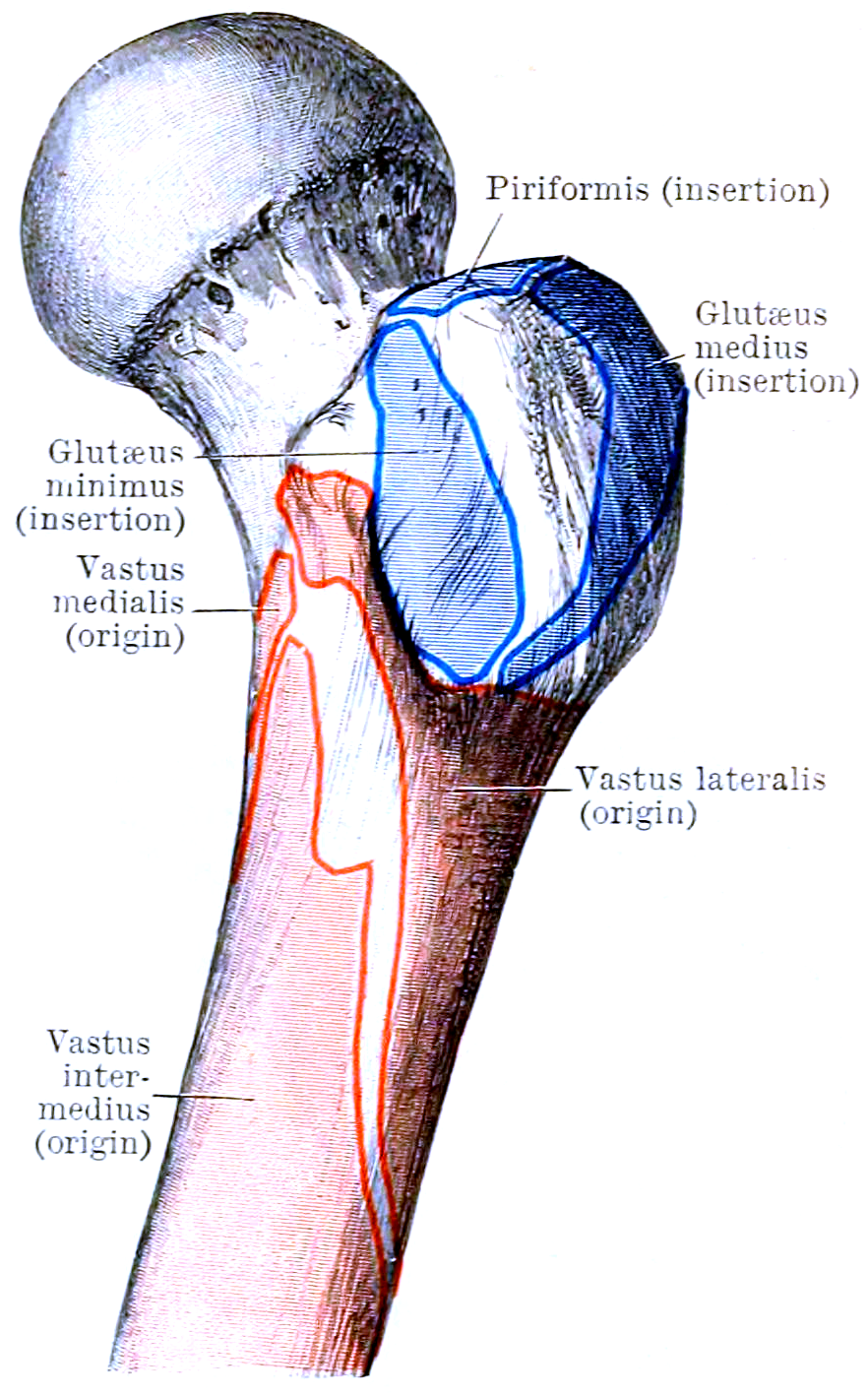
Attachment zone at the trochanter major.

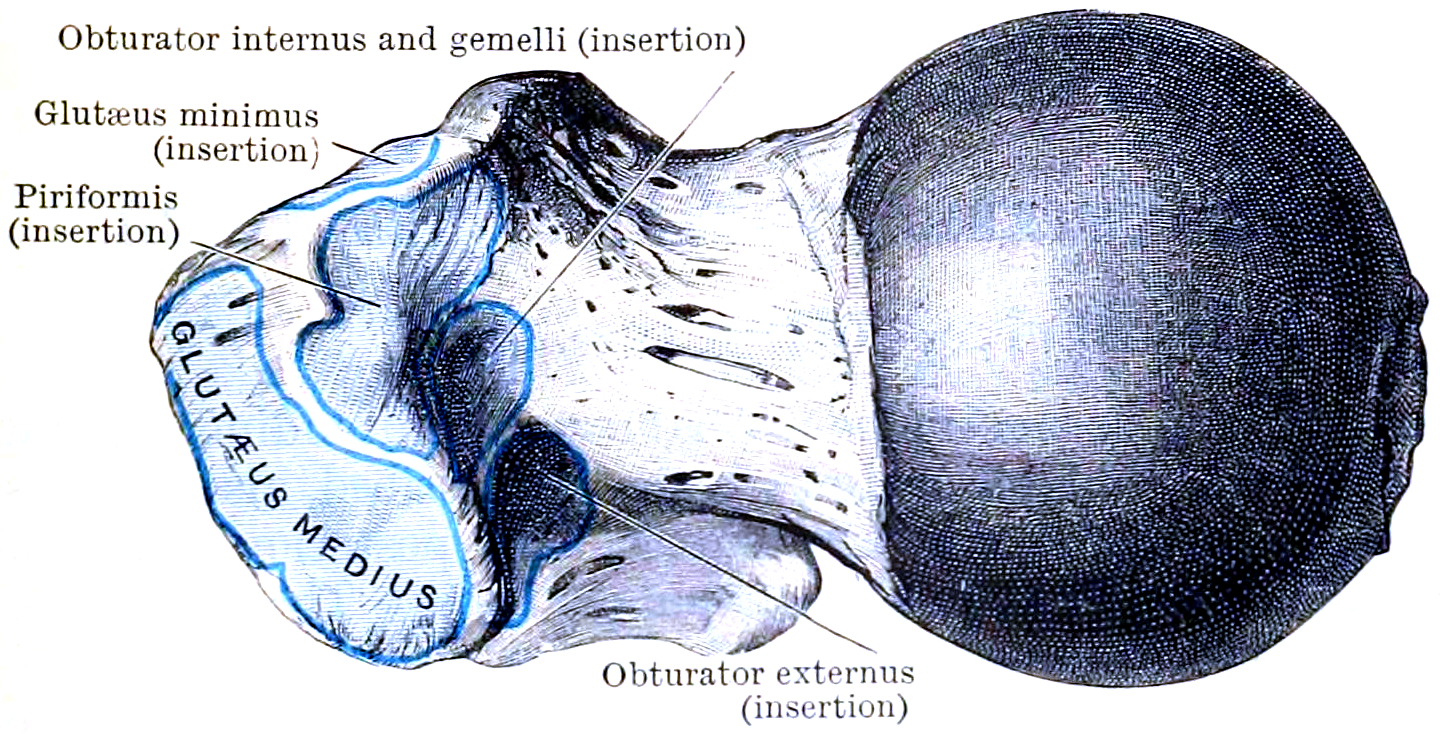
Attachment zone at the trochanter major.

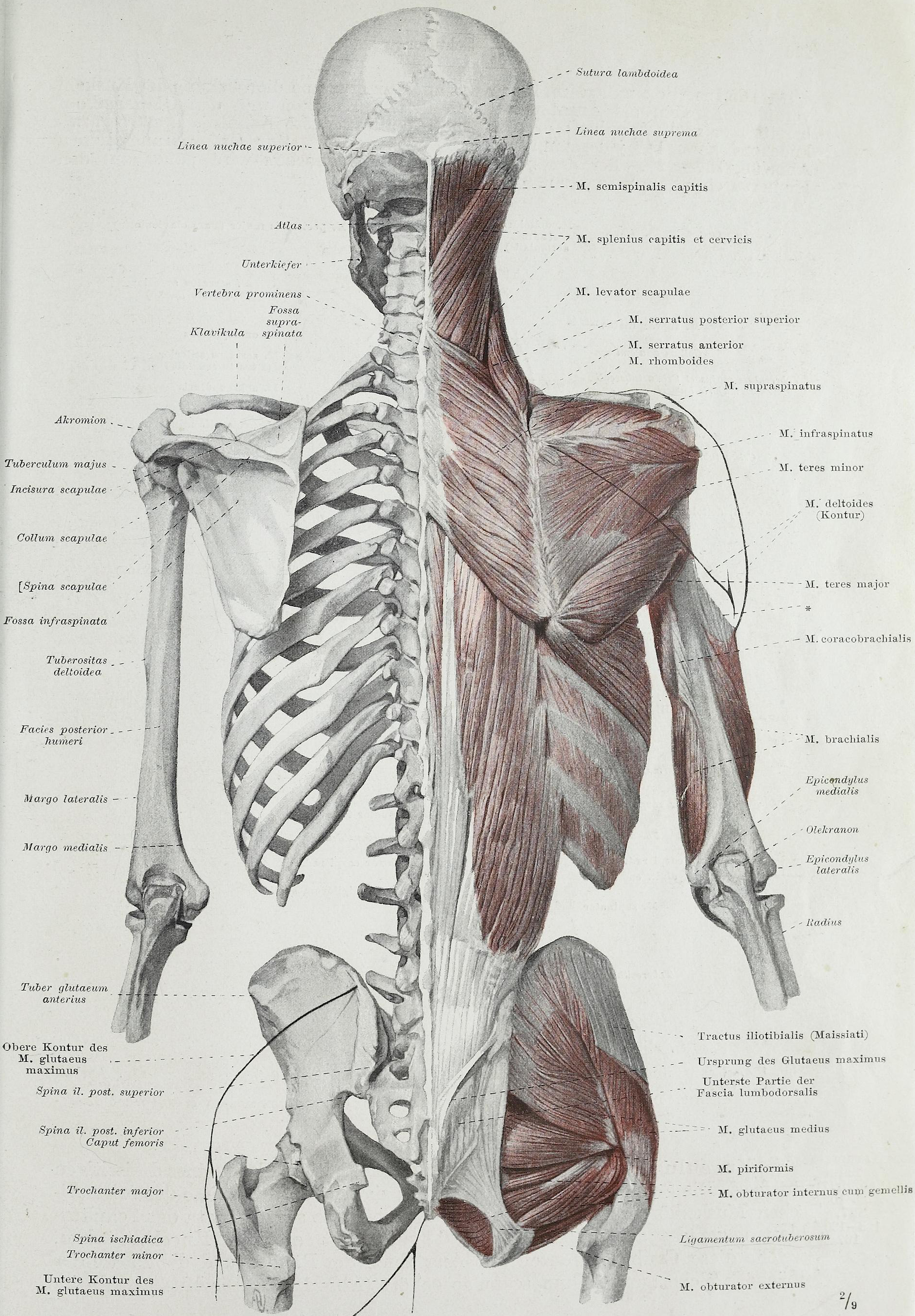
The fibers of the gluteus medius cross from anterior to posterior and vice versa before its insertion at the greater Trochanter. The iliotibial tract has been partially removed.

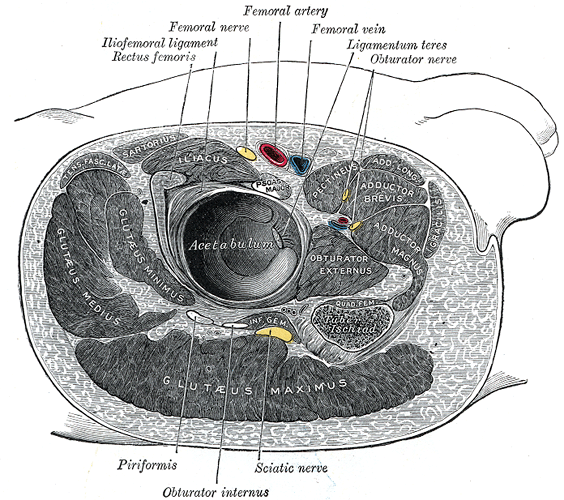
Structures surrounding right hip-joint.

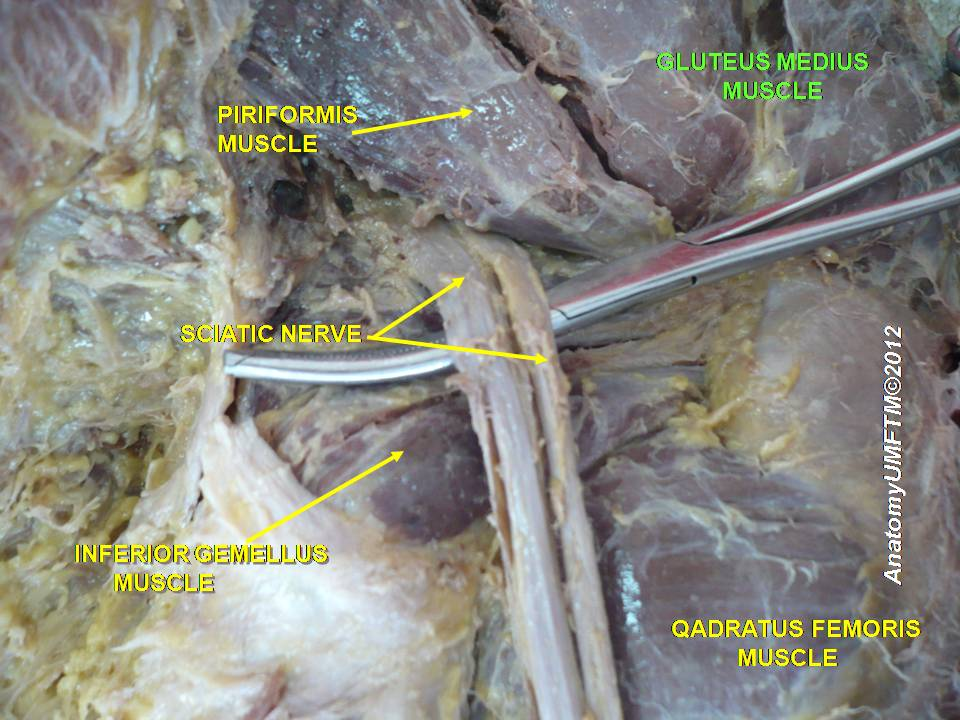
Gluteus medius muscle (shown in green text)

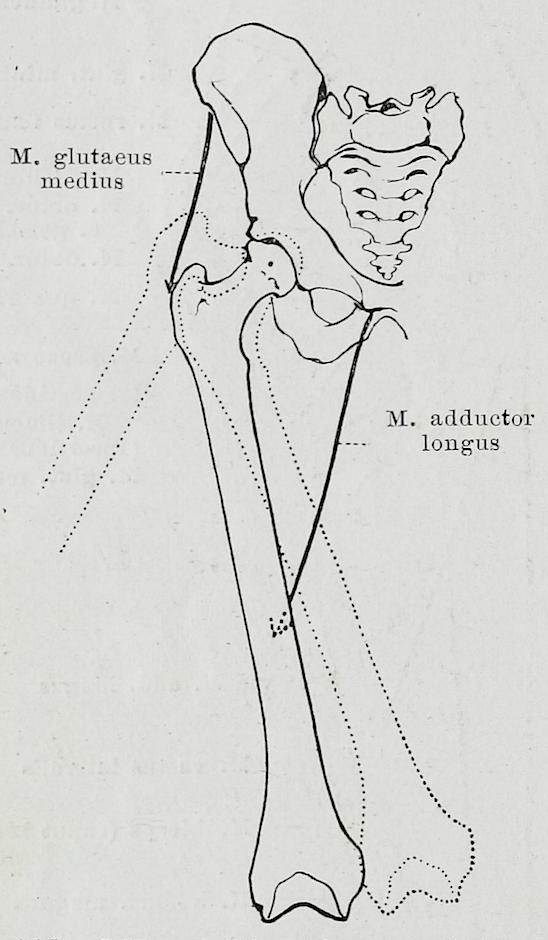
Adduction and abduction of the femur. The centre of rotation of the hip has been marked.

== See also ==
- Trendelenburg gait
