= Nerve plexus =

Network of nerve fibres

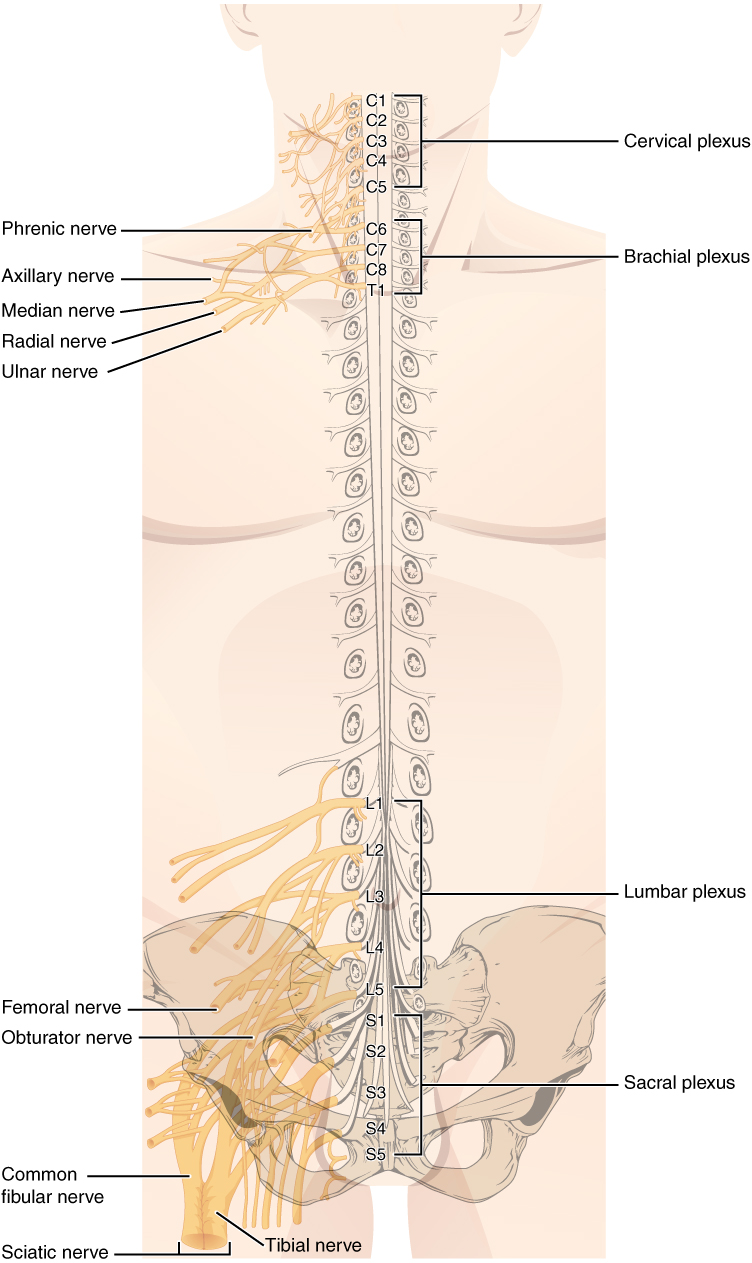
- Superimposed image of the spinal plexuses on a human back.

Identifiers
- TA2: 6172
- FMA: 5901

A nerve plexus is a plexus (branching network) of intersecting nerves. A nerve plexus is composed of afferent and efferent fibers that arise from the merging of the anterior rami of spinal nerves and blood vessels. There are five spinal nerve plexuses, except in the thoracic region, as well as other forms of autonomic plexuses, many of which are a part of the enteric nervous system. The nerves that arise from the plexuses have both sensory and motor functions. These functions include muscle contraction, the maintenance of body coordination and control, and the reaction to sensations such as heat, cold, pain, and pressure. There are several plexuses in the body, including:

- Spinal plexuses
  - Cervical plexus – serves the head, neck and shoulders
  - Brachial plexus – serves the chest, shoulders, arms and hands
  - Lumbosacral plexus
    - Lumbar plexus – serves the back, abdomen, groin, thighs, knees, and calves
      - Subsartorial plexus – below the sartorius muscle of thigh
    - Sacral plexus – serves the pelvis, buttocks, genitals, thighs, calves, and feet
    - Pudendal plexus
  - Coccygeal plexus – serves a small region over the coccyx
- Autonomic plexuses
  - Celiac plexus (solar plexus) – serves internal organs
  - Auerbach's plexus (myenteric plexus) – serves the gastrointestinal tract
  - Meissner's plexus (submucosal plexus) – serves the gastrointestinal tract
  - Pharyngeal plexus of vagus nerve – serves the palate and pharynx
  - Cardiac plexus – serves the heart

== Spinal plexuses ==
Spinal nerve

The following table shows the nerves that arise from each spinal plexus as well as the spinal level each plexus arises from.

Spinal plexus	Spinal level	Nerves (superior to inferior)
Cervical plexus	C1 – C5	Lesser occipital; Greater auricular; Transverse cervical; Ansa cervicalis; Supraclavicular; Phrenic
Brachial plexus	C5 – T1	Musculocutaneous; Axillary; Radial; Median; Ulnar
Lumbar plexus	L1 – L4	Iliohypogastric; Ilioinguinal; Genitofemoral; Lateral femoral cutaneous; Femoral; Obturator
Sacral plexus	L4, L5, S1 – S4	Superior gluteal; Inferior gluteal; Posterior cutaneous; Tibial; Fibular (peroneal); Pudendal
Coccygeal plexus	S4, S5, Co	helps contribute to pudendal: Anococcygeal

=== Cervical plexus ===
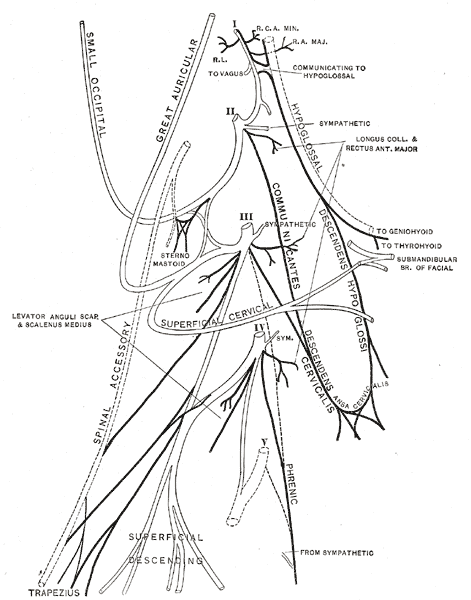
Cervical plexus

The cervical plexus is formed by the ventral rami of the upper four cervical nerves and the upper part of fifth cervical ventral ramus. The network of rami is located deep to the sternocleidomastoid within the neck. The cervical plexus innervates muscles of the neck and areas of skin on the head, neck and chest. The deep branches innervate muscles, while the superficial branches supply areas of skin. A long branch (primarily of fibers of C4 and with contributions of fibers from C3 and C5; nervus phrenicus) innervates muscles of the diaphragm. The cervical plexus also communicates with the cranial nerves vagus nerve and hypoglossal nerve.

=== Brachial plexus ===
Anatomical illustration of the brachial plexus with areas of roots, trunks, divisions and cords marked. Clicking on names of branches will link to their Wikipedia entry.

The brachial plexus is formed by the ventral rami of C5-C8-T1 spinal nerves, and lower and upper halves of C4 and T2 spinal nerves. The plexus extends toward the armpit. The ventral rami of C5 and C6 form upper trunk, the ventral ramus of C7 forms the middle trunk, and the ventral rami of C8 and T1 join to form the lower trunk of the brachial plexus. Under the clavicle, the trunks reorganize to form cords (fasciculi) around the axillary artery (arteria axillaris). The lateral cord (fasciculus lateralis) is formed by the upper and middle trunk, all three trunks join to form the posterior cord (fasciculus posterior), the lower trunk continues to the medial trunk (fasciculus medialis). The nerves (containing motor and sensory fibers) to the shoulder and to the upper limb emerge from the brachial plexus.

=== Lumbar plexus ===
The lumbar plexus and its branches.

Since the lumbar plexus and sacral plexus are interconnected, they are sometimes referred to as the lumbosacral plexus. The intercostal nerves that give rami to the chest and to the upper parts of the abdominal wall efferent motor innervation and to the pleura and peritoneum afferent sensory innervation are the only ones that do not originate from a plexus. The ventral rami of L1–L5 spinal nerves with a contribution of T12 form lumbar plexus. This plexus lies within the psoas major muscle. Nervi of the plexus serve the skin and the muscles of the lower abdominal wall, the thigh and external genitals. The largest nerve of the plexus is the femoral nerve. It supplies anterior muscles of the thigh and a part of skin distal to the inguinal ligament.

=== Sacral plexus ===
Plan of sacral and coccygeal plexuses.

Ventral rami of L4–S3 with parts of L4 and S4 spinal nerves form the sacral plexus. It is located on the posterior wall of pelvic cavity (pelvis minor). Nervi of the plexus innervate the perineal region, buttocks and the lower limb. The largest nerve of the human body, the sciatic nerve, is the main branch that gives rami to the motor innervation of the muscles of the thigh, the leg, and the foot. Common peroneal nerve and its branches innervate some parts of the skin of the foot, the peroneal muscles of the leg, and the dorsal muscles of the foot.

=== Coccygeal plexus ===
Coccygeal plexus originates from the ventral rami of spinal nerves S4, S5, and Co. It is interconnected with the lower part of sacral plexus. The only nerve of the plexus is the coccygeal nerve, that serves sensory innervation of the skin in the coccygeal region.

== Autonomic plexuses ==
Autonomic plexuses can contain both sympathetic and parasympathetic neurons.

The cardiac plexus is located near the aortic arch and the carina of the trachea.

The pulmonary plexus supplies innervation to the bronchial tree.

The celiac, or solar plexus, is located around the celiac trunk and contains the celiac ganglia. The solar plexus is the largest autonomic plexus and provides innervation to multiple abdominal and pelvic organs.

The superior mesenteric plexus includes the superior mesenteric ganglia and is located around the superior mesenteric artery. The inferior mesenteric plexus includes the inferior mesenteric ganglia and is located around the inferior mesenteric artery. Together, these plexuses innervate the intestines.

Some other plexuses include the superior and inferior hypogastric plexus, renal plexus, hepatic plexus, splenic plexus, gastric plexus, pancreatic plexus, and testicular plexus / ovarian plexus.

== See also ==
- Plexus
- Brachial plexus
- Cranial nerve
- Spinal nerve
- List of anatomy mnemonics
- Nerve tract
- Neural pathway
- Neural circuit

== Sources ==
- Henry Gray: Anatomy of the human body (Bartleby.com; Great Books Online)
- Richard S. Snell: Clinical neuroanatomy (Lippincott Williams & Wilkins, Ed.6th 2006) Philadelphia, Baltimore, New York, London. ISBN 978-963-226-293-2
- Eldra P. Solomon - Richard R. Schmidt - Peter J. Adragna : Human anatomy & physiology ed. 2nd 1990 (Sunders College Publishing, Philadelphia) ISBN 0-03-011914-6
- Jochen Staubesand (Ed.); R. Putz, R. Pabst, Johannes Sobotta: Sobotta Atlas of Human Anatomy I-II. (Urban & Schwarzenberg, München 1982) ISBN 3-541-72710-1
- Saladin, Kenneth S. Anatomy & Physiology: The Unity of Form and Function. New York, NY: McGraw-Hill, 2007. Print.
