= Myotome =

Group of tissues

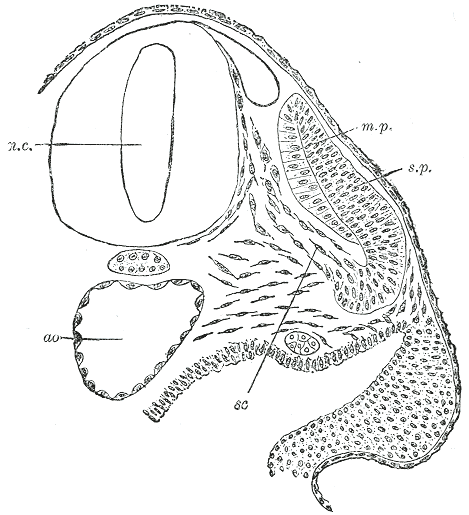

A myotome is the group of muscles that a single spinal nerve innervates. Similarly a dermatome is an area of skin that a single nerve innervates with sensory fibers. Myotomes are separated by myosepta (singular: myoseptum). In vertebrate embryonic development, a myotome is the part of a somite that develops into muscle.

== Structure ==
The anatomical term myotome which describes the muscles served by a spinal nerve root, is also used in embryology to describe that part of the somite which develops into the muscles. In anatomy the myotome is the motor equivalent of a dermatome.

== Function ==
Each muscle in the body is supplied by one or more levels or segments of the spinal cord and by their corresponding spinal nerves. A group of muscles innervated by the motor fibres of a single nerve root is known as a myotome.

=== List of myotomes ===
Myotome distributions of the upper and lower extremity are as follows;

- C1/C2: neck flexion/extension
- C3: Lateral Neck Flexion
- C4: shoulder elevation
- C5: Shoulder abduction
- C6: Elbow flexion/Wrist Extension
- C7: Elbow extension/Wrist flexion
- C8: Thumb extension
- T1: Finger Abduction & Adduction
- L1/L2: Hip Flexion
- L3: Knee extension
- L4: Ankle dorsi-flexion
- L5: Great toe extension
- S1: Hip extension/Ankle plantar-flexion/ankle eversion
- S2: Knee flexion
- S3–S4: anal wink

== Clinical significance ==
In humans myotome testing can be an integral part of neurological examination as each nerve root coming from the spinal cord supplies a specific group of muscles. Testing of myotomes, in the form of isometric resisted muscle testing, provides the clinician with information about the level in the spine where a lesion may be present. During myotome testing, the clinician is looking for muscle weakness of a particular group of muscles. Results may indicate lesion to the spinal cord nerve root, or intervertebral disc herniation pressing on the spinal nerve roots.
