= Perforating cutaneous nerve =

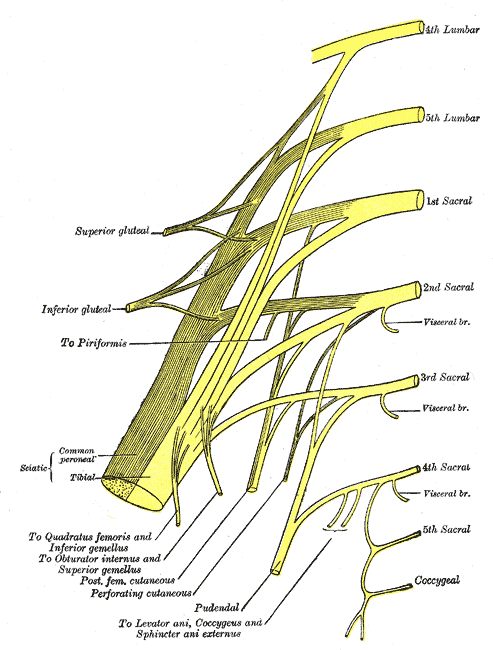
- Plan of sacral and pudendal plexuses.

- Cutaneous nerves of the right lower extremity. Front and posterior views. (Perforating cutaneous nerve not labeled, but region visible.)

Details
- From: S2-S3, sacral plexus
- Innervates: Gluteal sulcus

Identifiers
- Latin: nervus cutaneus perforans
- TA98: A14.2.07.036
- TA2: 6546
- FMA: 19040

The perforating cutaneous nerve is a cutaneous nerve of the sacral plexus that provides sensory innervation to the skin of the buttocks.

== Structure ==
=== Origin ===
The perforating cutaneous nerve typically arises from the posterior divisions of anterior rami of sacral spinal nerves S2 and S3 of the sacral plexus.

=== Course ===
It pierces the inferior part of the sacrotuberous ligament, then passes along the inferior border of the gluteus maximus muscle.

=== Distribution ===
The perforating cutaneous nerve innervates the skin that overlies the inferomedial portion of gluteus maximus muscle.

=== Variation ===
Origin

The perforating cutaneous nerve may arise from the pudendal nerve. It is occasionally united with the pudendal nerve at its origin.

It may be absent (this is the case in 36% of individuals) in which case it is replaced by a branch from either the posterior cutaneous nerve of thigh or from the anterior rami of either S3-S4 or S4-S5.

Course

Instead of piercing the sacrotuberous ligament, the perforating cutaneous may instead run with the pudendal nerve, or pass in between the sacrotuberous ligament and the gluteus maximus muscle.

== See also ==
- Sacral plexus
