= Piriformis nerve =

Nerve within the hip

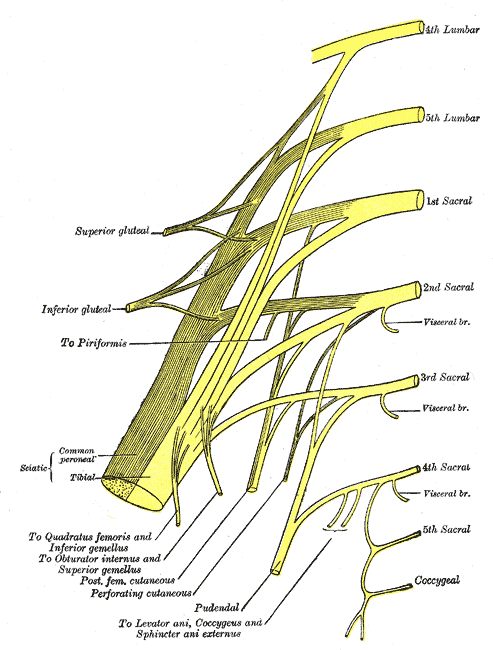
- Diagram of sacral plexus and pudendal plexus. (Label "to piriformis" is at center left.)

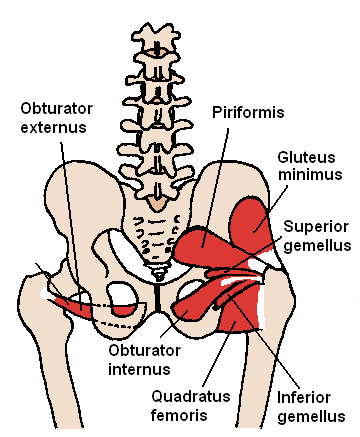
- The piriformis and nearby muscles

Details
- From: Sacral plexus (S1–S2)
- Innervates: Piriformis muscle

Identifiers
- Latin: nervus musculi piriformis
- TA98: A14.2.07.029
- TA2: 6545
- FMA: 16509

The piriformis nerve, also known as the nerve to piriformis, is the peripheral nerve that provides motor innervation to the piriformis muscle.

== Structure ==
=== Origin ===
The nerve to piriformis is a branch of the sacral plexus. It (typically) arises from the posterior divisions/branches of anterior rami of S1 and S2.

=== Course ===
It enters the anterior surface of the piriformis muscle.

=== Variation ===
Origin

It may sometimes arise from the anterior ramus of S2 only.

Number

It may be doubled. An additional branch may arise from the superior gluteal nerve.

=== Distribution ===
The piriformis nerve innervates the piriformis muscle.

== See also ==
- Piriformis
- Sacral plexus
