= Plexus =

Branching network of vessels or nerves

In anatomy, a plexus (from the Latin term for 'braid') is a branching network of blood vessels, lymphatic vessels, or nerves. The nerves are typically axons outside the central nervous system.

The standard plural form in English is plexuses. Alternatively, the Latin plural plexūs may be used.

== Types ==
=== Nerve plexuses ===
The four primary nerve plexuses are the cervical plexus, brachial plexus, lumbar plexus, and the sacral plexus.

=== Choroid plexus ===
The choroid plexus is a part of the central nervous system in the brain and consists of capillaries, brain ventricles, and ependymal cells.

== Invertebrates ==
The plexus is the characteristic form of nervous system in the coelenterates and persists with modifications in the flatworms. The nerves of the radially symmetric echinoderms also take this form, where a plexus underlies the ectoderm of these animals and deeper in the body other nerve cells form plexuses of limited extent.

== See also ==
- Cranial nerve
- Spinal nerve
- Nerve plexus
- Brachial nerve
- List of anatomy mnemonics
