= Furcal nerve =

Nerve linking the lumbar and sacral plexus

The furcal nerve (forked nerve) links the lumbar plexus and the sacral plexus. It has its own dorsal and ventral branches with fibres that branch out to become part of the femoral and obturator nerves. The furcal nerve is found in the lumbosacral trunk most commonly at the level of the fourth lumbar vertebra (L4).

== Structure and location ==
The furcal nerve is an independent nerve that links the lumbar plexus to the sacral plexus. It is most commonly found at the level of the fourth lumbar vertebra. The next most common site is the level of the third lumbar vertebra (L3). The furcal nerve can be found at any level from L1 to S1 but has not been reported at L1. Occasionally a double furcal nerve is found.

It gives branches to the femoral nerve, lumbosacral trunk, and obturator nerve.

== Clinical significance ==
The furcal nerve is found at various locations and can give problems in the diagnosis of a radiculopathy or sciatic pain. It is the main cause of atypical symptoms of sciatic and radicular pain, that are often due to lumbar disc herniation. A study found evidence of double-rooted abnormality in most of the cases looked at.
