= Sulcus =

Sulcus (Latin for "furrow"; pl. sulci) may refer to:

- Sulcus primigenius, the sacred furrow created at the foundation of Roman cities in antiquity
- Gingival sulcus, the space between a tooth and surrounding tissue
- Gluteal sulcus, the horizontal crease in humans and certain other primates where the lower end of the buttocks join the thigh
- Sulcus (morphology), a groove, crevice or furrow in medicine, botany, and zoology
- Sulcus (neuroanatomy), a crevice on the surface of the brain
- Sulcus (geology), a long parallel groove on a planet or a moon
- Coronal sulcus, the groove under the corona of the glans penis
- In botany, sulci in seeds or pollen grains are colpi

== See also ==
- Sulci, an ancient town in southwest Sardinia notable for the Battle of Sulci in 258 BC
- Sulcalization, a term in phonetics and phonology
- Gyrification
