= Sacral plexus =

Nerve plexus

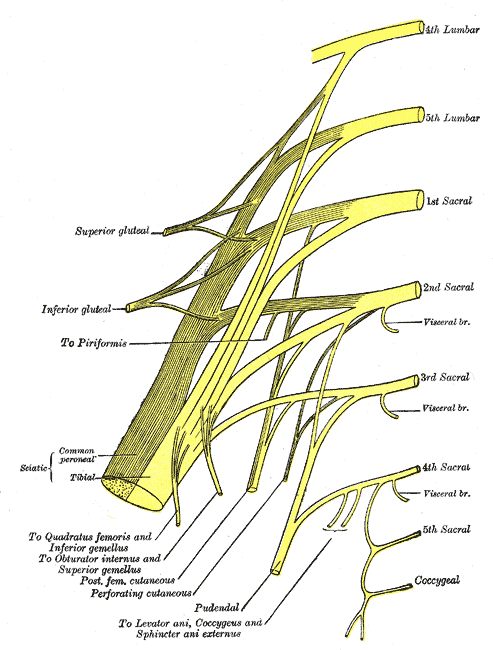
- Plan of sacral and pudendal plexuses.

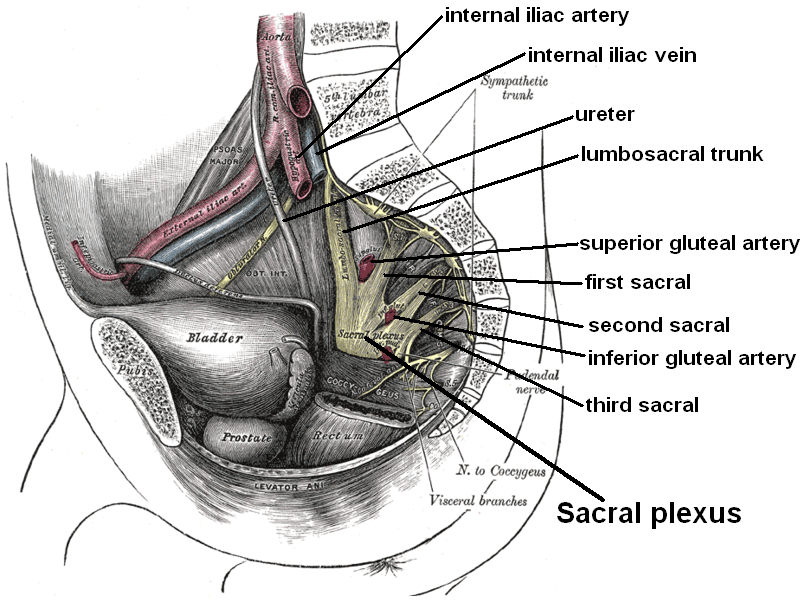
- Relations of the sacral plexus. Dissection of side wall of pelvis showing sacral and pudendal plexuses.

Details
- From: L4-L5, S1-S4

Identifiers
- Latin: plexus sacralis
- TA98: A14.2.07.027
- TA2: 6539
- FMA: 5909

In human anatomy, the sacral plexus is a nerve plexus which provides motor and sensory nerves for the posterior thigh, most of the lower leg and foot, and part of the pelvis. It is part of the lumbosacral plexus and emerges from the lumbar vertebrae and sacral vertebrae (L4-S4). A sacral plexopathy is a disorder affecting the nerves of the sacral plexus, usually caused by trauma, nerve compression, vascular disease, or infection. Symptoms may include pain, loss of motor control, and sensory deficits.

== Structure ==
The sacral plexus is formed by:

- the lumbosacral trunk
- the anterior division of the first sacral nerve
- portions of the anterior divisions of the second and third sacral nerves

The nerves forming the sacral plexus converge toward the lower part of the greater sciatic foramen, and unite to form a flattened band, from the anterior and posterior surfaces of which several branches arise. The band itself is continued as the sciatic nerve, which splits on the back of the thigh into the tibial nerve and common fibular nerve; these two nerves sometimes arise separately from the plexus, and in all cases their independence can be shown by dissection. Often, the sacral plexus and the lumbar plexus are considered to be one large nerve plexus, the lumbosacral plexus. The lumbosacral trunk connects the two plexuses.

=== Relations ===
The sacral plexus lies on the back of the pelvis in front of the piriformis muscle and the pelvic fascia. In front of it are the internal iliac artery, internal iliac vein, the ureter, and the sigmoid colon. The superior gluteal artery and vein run between the lumbosacral trunk and the first sacral nerve, and the inferior gluteal artery and vein between the second and third sacral nerves.

== Nerves formed ==
All the nerves entering the plexus, with the exception of the third sacral, split into ventral and dorsal divisions, and the nerves arising from these are as follows of the table below:

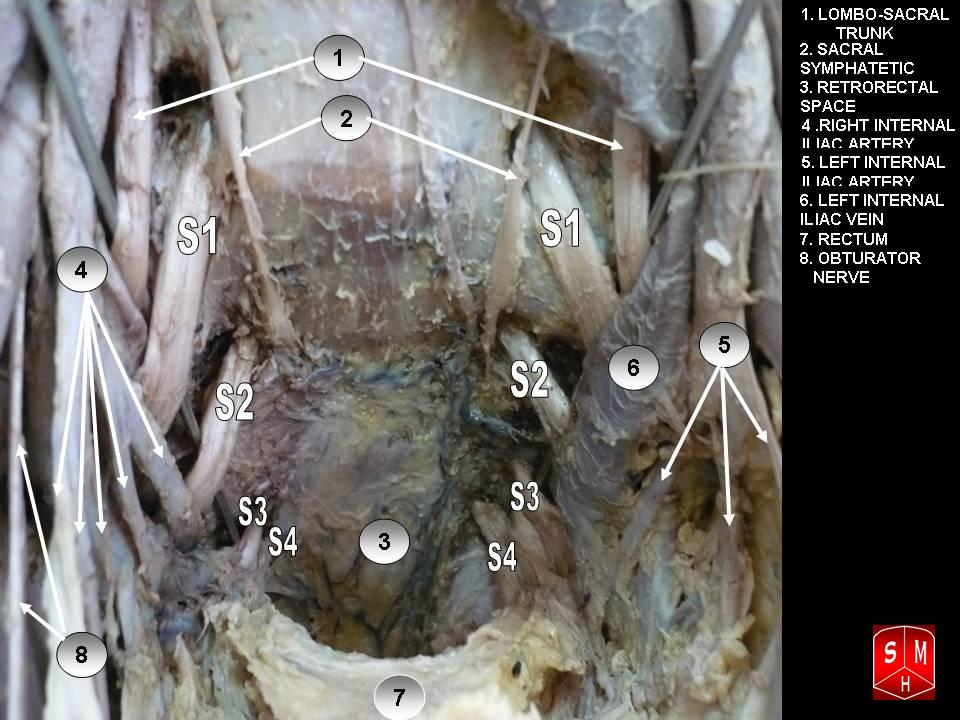
Sacral plexus

Nerves of the sacral plexus
| Nerve | Segment | Innervated muscles | Cutaneous branches |
|---|---|---|---|
| Superior gluteal | L4-S1 | Gluteus medius Gluteus minimus Tensor fasciae latae | |
| Inferior gluteal | L5-S2 | Gluteus maximus | |
| Posterior cutaneous femoral: Inferior cluneal nerves; Perineal branches | S1-S3 | | |
| Perforating cutaneous | S2-S3 | | |
Direct branches from plexus
| Piriformis | S1-2 | Piriformis | |
| Obturator internus | L5, S1-2 | Obturator internus and Superior gemellus | |
| Quadratus femoris | L4-5, S1 | Quadratus femoris and Inferior gemellus | |
Sciatic
| Sciatic | L4-S3 | Semitendinosus (Tib); Semimembranosus (Tib); Biceps femoris: Long head (Tib); Short head (Fib); Adductor magnus (medial part, Tib) | |
| Common fibular | L4-S2 | | Lateral sural cutaneous Communicating fibular |
| Superficial fibular | | Fibularis longus Fibularis brevis | Medial dorsal cutaneous Intermediate dorsal cutaneous |
| Deep fibular | | Tibialis anterior Extensor digitorum longus Extensor digitorum brevis Extensor hallucis longus Extensor hallucis brevis Fibularis tertius | Lateral cutaneous nerve of big toe Intermediate dorsal cutaneous |
| Tibial nerve | L4-S3 | Triceps surae(Gastrocnemius, Soleus); Popliteus; Plantaris; Tibialis posterior Flexor digitorum longus Flexor hallucis longus | Medial sural cutaneous Medial calcaneal Lateral dorsal cutaneous |
| Medial plantar | | Abductor hallucis Flexor digitorum brevis Flexor hallucis brevis (medial head); Lumbrical (only first) | Proper digital plantar |
| Lateral plantar | | Flexor hallucis brevis (lateral head); Quadratus plantae Abductor digiti minimi Flexor digiti minimi Lumbrical (second third and fourth); Plantar interossei (first to third); Dorsal interossei (first to fifth); Adductor hallucis | Proper plantar digital |
Pudendal and coccygeal
| Pudendal (Pudendal plexus) | S2-S4 | Muscles of the pelvic floor: Levator ani Superficial transverse perineal Deep transverse perineal Bulbospongiosus; Ischiocavernosus; Sphincter anus externus Urethral sphincter | Inferior rectal Perineal: Posterior scrotal/labial; Dorsal penis/clitoris; prostatic urethra./vagina |
| Coccygeal (Coccygeal plexus) | S5-Co1 | Coccygeus | Anococcygeal; Dorsal branches |

== Additional images ==
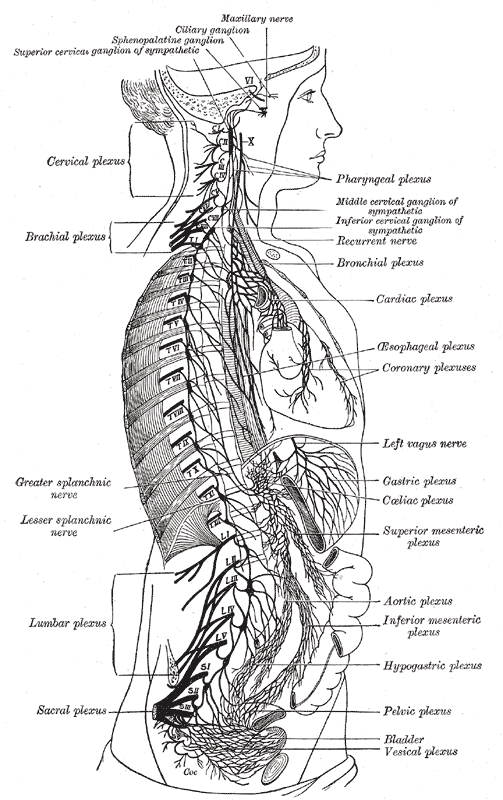
The right sympathetic chain and its connections with the thoracic, abdominal, and pelvic plexuses.

A schematic depiction.

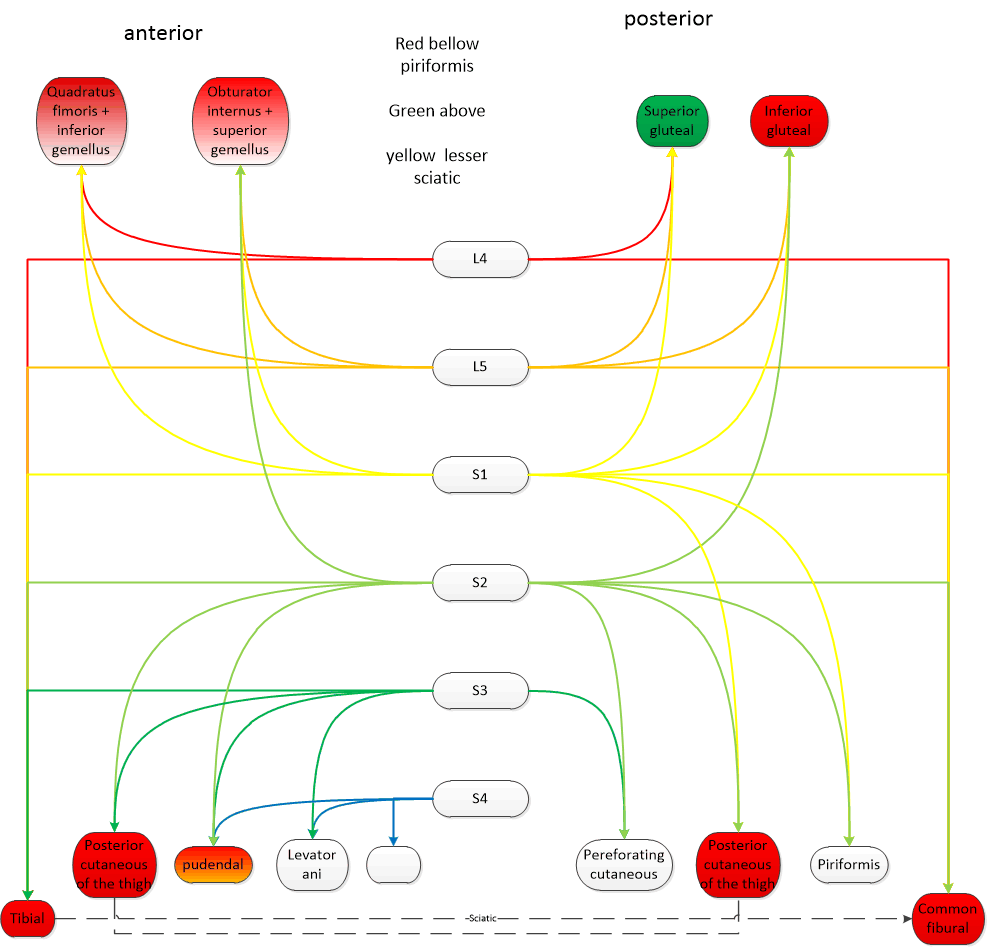
Diagram of the sacral plexus

== See also ==
- Cervical plexus
- Brachial plexus
- Lumbar plexus
- Coccygeal plexus
- Lumbosacral plexus
- Nerve plexus
- Sciatic nerve
- Pudendal nerve
- Posterior femoral cutaneous nerve
- Superior gluteal nerve
- Inferior gluteal nerve
