= Coccygeal plexus =

Nerve plexus near the coccyx bone

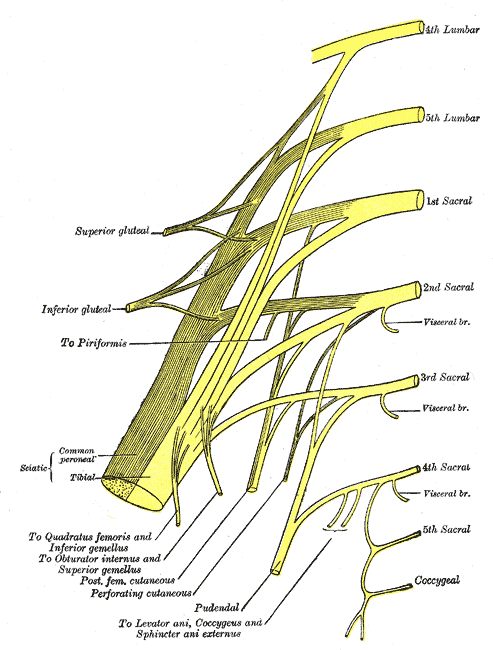
- Plan of sacral and pudendal plexuses.

Details
- From: S4-S5, coccygeal nerve
- To: anococcygeal nerve

Identifiers
- Latin: plexus coccygeus
- TA98: A14.2.07.044
- TA2: 6598
- FMA: 45356

The coccygeal plexus is a small nervous plexus upon the pelvic (anterior) surface of the coccygeus muscle.

This plexus is formed by the ventral rami of the fourth and fifth sacral nerves (S4-S5), and the ventral ramus of the coccygeal nerve (Co). The relative contributions of S4 and S5 are minor and major, respectively. The coccygeal plexus gives rise to the anococcygeal nerve.

The coccygeal plexus is distributed to the coccygeus muscle, part of the levator ani muscle, the sacrococcygeal symphysis, and (via the anococcygeal nerve) a small area of skin between the tip of the coccyx, and the anus.

== See also ==
- Coccydynia (coccyx pain, tailbone pain)
- Ganglion impar
- Sacral plexus
- Anococcygeal nerve
- Coccyx
- Levator ani muscle
- Coccygeus muscle
