= Cervical spinal nerve 4 =

Spinal nerve of the cervical segment

Cervical spinal nerve
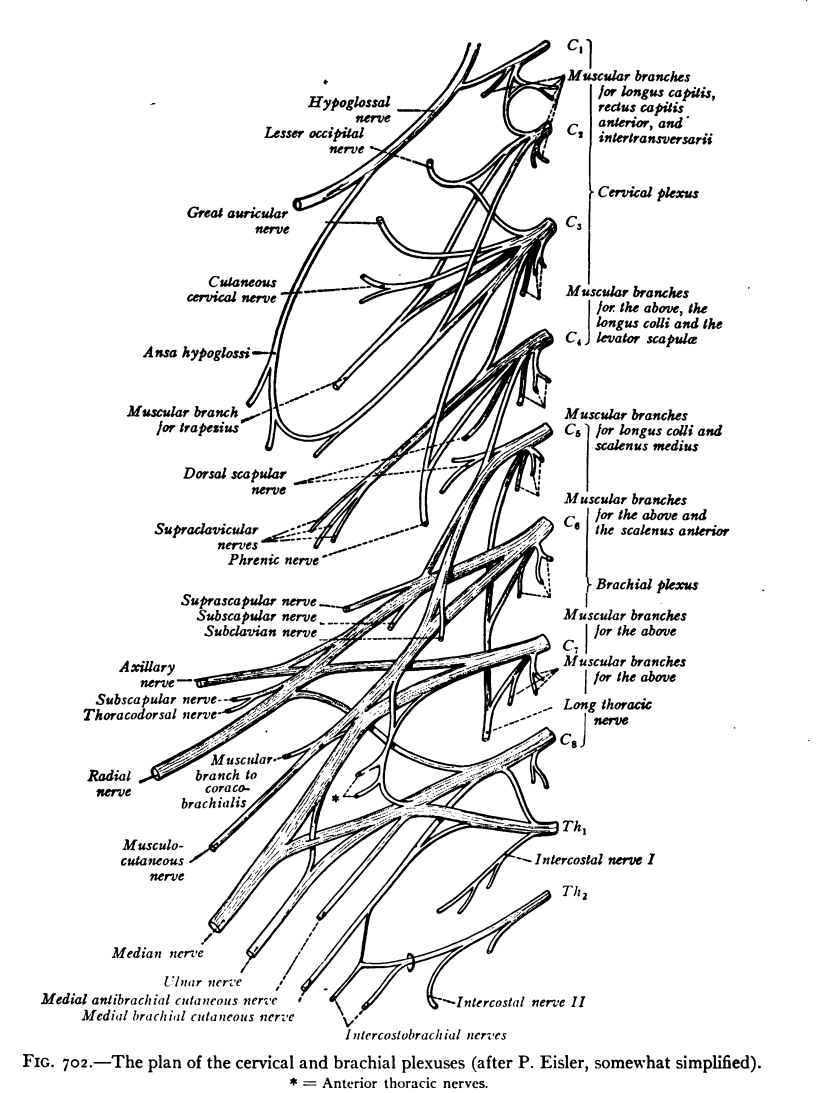
- The plan of the cervical and brachial plexuses.

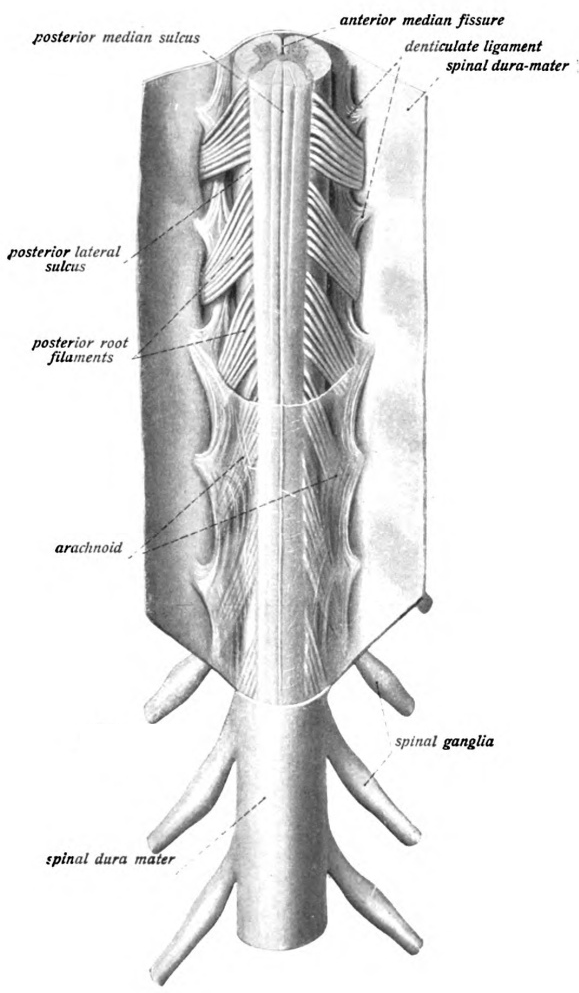
- The spinal cord with spinal nerves.

Details

Identifiers
- Latin: nervi spinalis
- FMA: 6445

Cervical spinal nerve 4, also called C4, is a spinal nerve of the cervical segment. It originates from the spinal cord above the 4th cervical vertebra (C4). It contributes nerve fibers to the phrenic nerve, the motor nerve to the thoracoabdominal diaphragm. It also provides motor nerves for the longus capitis, longus colli, anterior scalene, middle scalene, and levator scapulae muscles. C4 contributes some sensory fibers to the supraclavicular nerves, responsible for sensation from the skin above the clavicle. C4 and C5 are the areas that see the highest amount of cervical spine trauma.

== Gallery ==
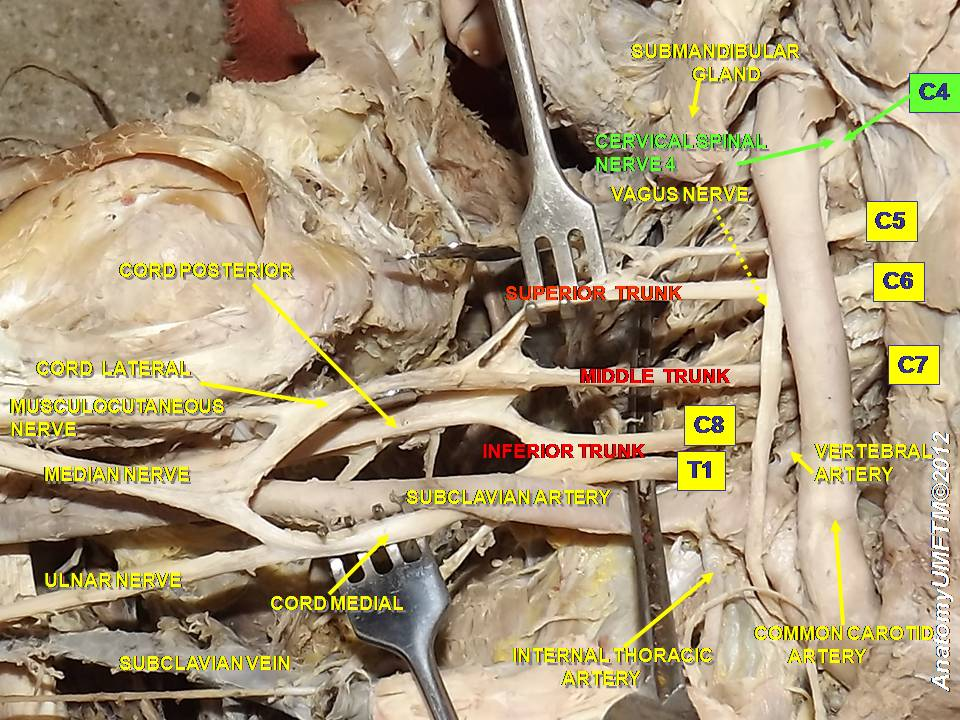
Cervical spinal nerve 4

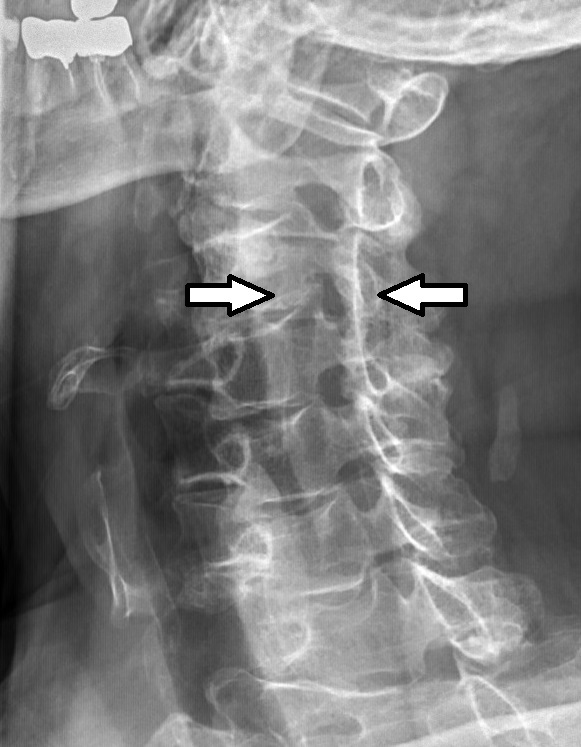
Projectional radiograph of a man presenting with pain by the nape and left shoulder, showing a stenosis in the intervertebral foramen of cervical spinal nerve 4, corresponding with the affected dermatome.
