= Tensor fasciae latae muscle =

Muscle of the thigh

Tensor fasciae latae
- The tensor fasciae latae and nearby muscles

Details
- Pronunciation: /ˈtɛnsər ˈfæʃii ˈleɪti/
- Origin: Iliac crest
- Insertion: Iliotibial tract (via greater trochanter)
- Artery: Primarily lateral circumflex femoral artery, superior gluteal artery
- Nerve: Superior gluteal nerve (L4, L5, S1)
- Actions: Hip - flexion, medial rotation, abduction, knee - lateral rotation, torso - stabilization

Identifiers
- Latin: musculus tensor fasciae latae
- TA98: A04.7.02.010
- TA2: 2602
- FMA: 22423

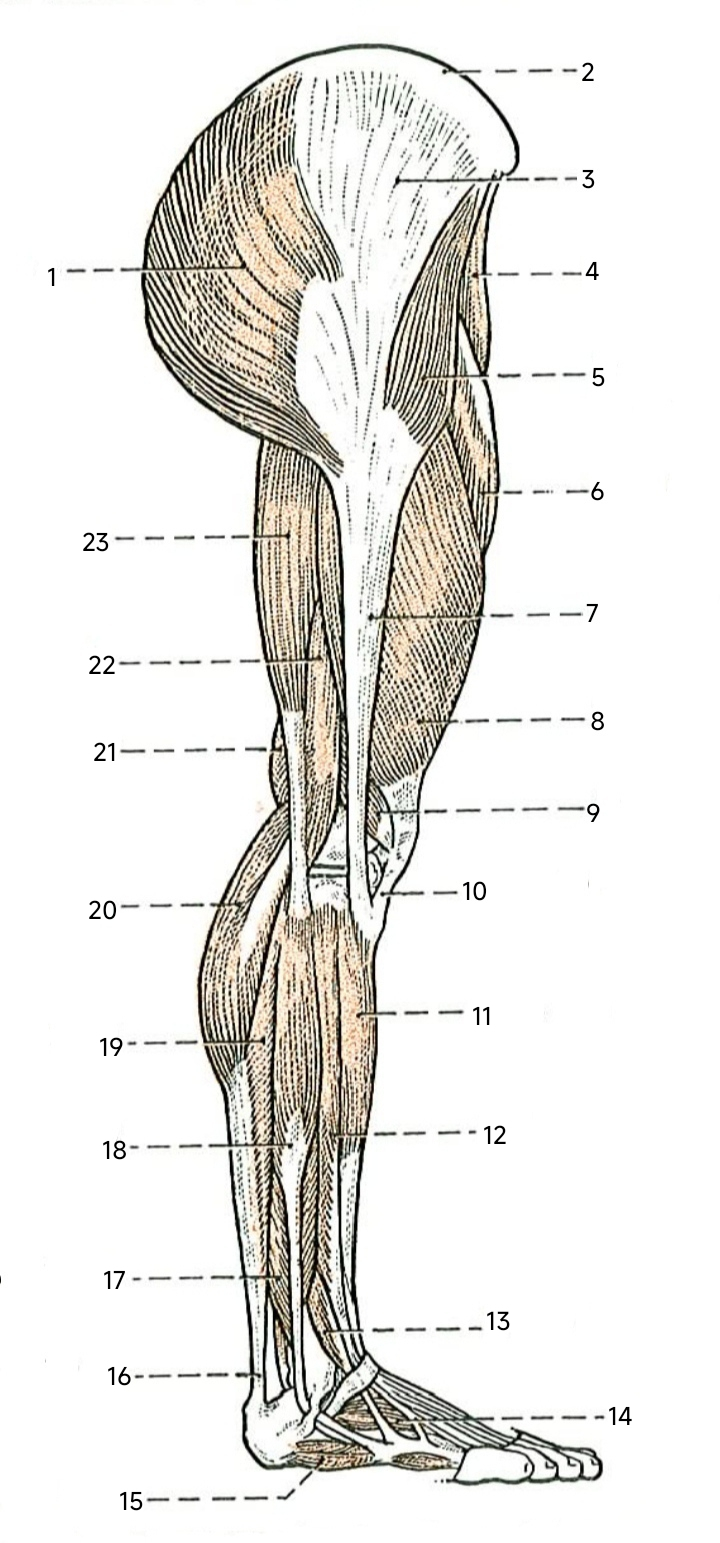
Muscles of the lower limb; right side, lateral view. 1 Gluteus maximus – 2 Iliac crest — 3 Fascia lata — 4 Sartorius — 5 Tensor fasciae latae — 6 Rectus femoris — 7 Maissat's band — 8 Vastus lateralis — 9 Vastus intermedius — 10 Patellar tendon — 11 Tibialis anterior — 12 Extensor digitorum longus — 13 Fibularis tertius — 14 Extensor digitorum brevis — 15 Abductor digiti minimi — 16 Achilles tendon — 17 Fibularis brevis — 18 Fibularis longus — 19 Soleus — 20 Gastronecmius — 21 Semimembranosus — 22 Short head of biceps — 23 Long head of biceps. (After Charpy.)

The tensor fasciae latae (or tensor fasciæ latæ or, formerly, tensor vaginae femoris) is a muscle of the thigh. Together with the gluteus maximus, it acts on and is continuous with the iliotibial band, which attaches to the tibia. The muscle assists in keeping the balance of the pelvis while standing, walking, or running.

== Structure ==
The tensor fasciae latae arises from the anterior part of the outer lip of the iliac crest; from the outer surface of the anterior superior iliac spine, and part of the outer border of the notch below it, between the gluteus medius and sartorius; and from the deep surface of the fascia lata.

The tensor fasciae latae is inserted between the two layers of the iliotibial tract of the fascia lata about the junction of the middle and upper thirds of the thigh. It tautens the iliotibial tract and braces the knee, especially when the opposite foot is lifted. The terminal insertion point lies on the lateral condyle of the tibia.

=== Nerve supply ===
Tensor fasciae latae is innervated by the superior gluteal nerve, L5 and S1. At its origins of the anterior rami of L4, L5, and S1 nerves, the superior gluteal nerve exits the pelvis via greater sciatic foramen superior to the piriformis. The nerve also courses between the gluteus medius and minimus. The superior gluteal artery also supplies the tensor fasciae latae. The superior gluteal nerve arises from the sacral plexus and only has muscular innervation associated with it. There is no cutaneous innervation for sensation that stems from the superior gluteal nerve.

== Function ==
The tensor fasciae latae is a tensor of the fascia lata; continuing its action, the oblique direction of its fibers enables it to stabilize the hip in extension (assists gluteus maximus during hip extension). The fascia lata is a fibrous sheath that encircles the thigh like a subcutaneous stocking and tightly binds its muscles. On the lateral surface, it combines with the tendons of the gluteus maximus and tensor fasciae latae to form the iliotibial tract, which extends from the iliac crest to the lateral condyle of the tibia.

In the erect posture, acting from below, it will serve to steady the pelvis upon the head of the femur; and by means of the iliotibial tract it steadies the condyles of the femur on the articular surfaces of the tibia, and assists the gluteus maximus in supporting the knee in a position of extension.

The basic functional movement of tensor fasciae latae is walking. The tensor fasciae latae is heavily utilized in horse riding, hurdling, and water skiing. Some problems that arise when this muscle is tight or shortened are pelvic imbalances that lead to pain in the hips, as well as pain in the lower back and lateral area of knees.

Because of its insertion point on the lateral condyle of the tibia, it also aids in the lateral rotation of the tibia. This lateral rotation may be initiated in conjunction with hip abduction and medial rotation of the femur while kicking a soccer ball. The tensor fasciae latae works in synergy with the gluteus medius and gluteus minimus muscles to abduct and medially rotate the femur.

The TFL is a hip abductor muscle. To stretch the tensor fasciae latae, the knee may be brought medially across the body (adducted). If one leans against a wall with crossed legs (externally/laterally rotated hips) and pushes the pelvis away from the wall (leaning the upper body towards it) sidebending the lumbar spine (i.e.: curving the spine to the side) should be avoided as it stretches the lumbar region rather than the tensor fasciae latae and other muscles which cross the hip rather than the spine.

== Clinical significance ==
=== Strain ===
A small case notes that “it seems possible that a sloped or banked surface could predispose an individual to a TFL strain.” In such a case, “treatment usually consists of rest, heat, and flexibility exercises”, such as lliotibial band stretching.

== Etymology ==
"Tensor fasciae latae" translates from Latin to English as "stretcher of the side band". "Tensor" is an agent noun that comes from the past participle stem "tens-" of the Latin verb "tendere", meaning "to stretch". "Fasciae" is the Latin term for "of the band" and is in the singular genitive case. "Latae" is the respective singular, genitive, feminine form of the Latin adjective "latus" meaning "side".

== Additional images ==
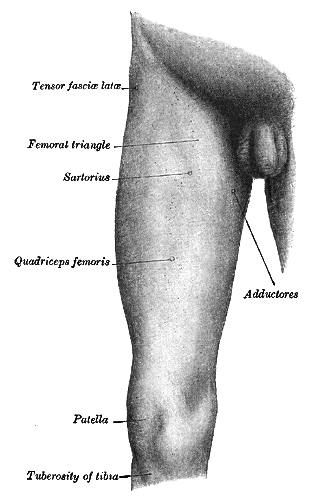
Front of the right thigh, with the position of the tensor fasciae latae indicated.

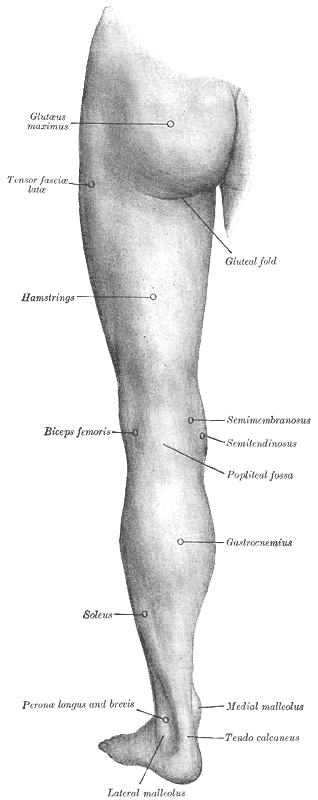
Back of the left thigh, with the position of the tensor fasciae latae indicated.

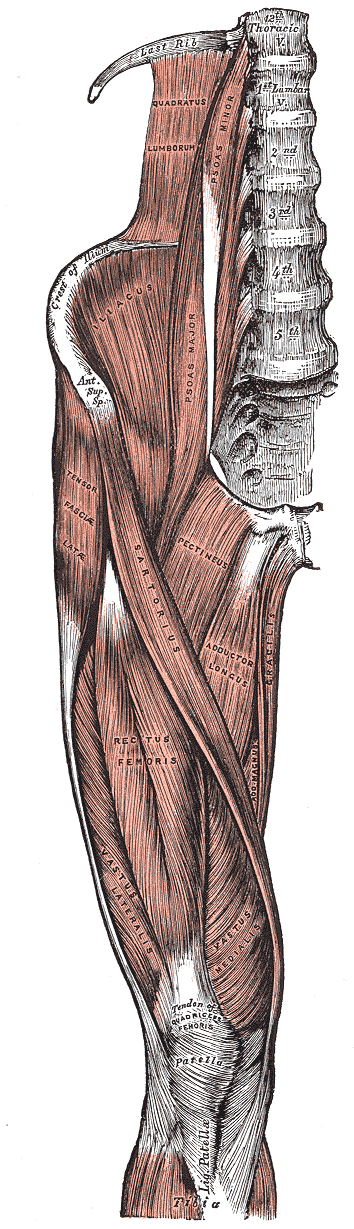
Muscles of the pelvis and upper leg, showing the tensor fasciae latae at the middle left.

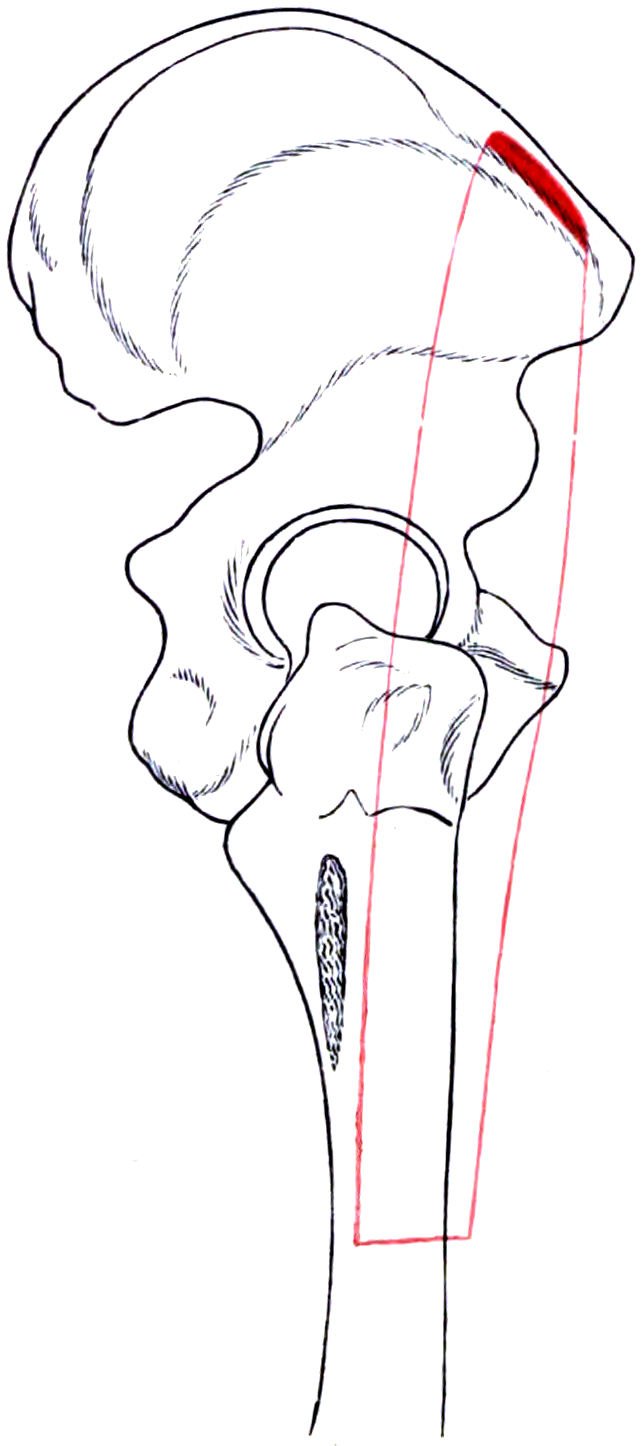
Origin and attachment.

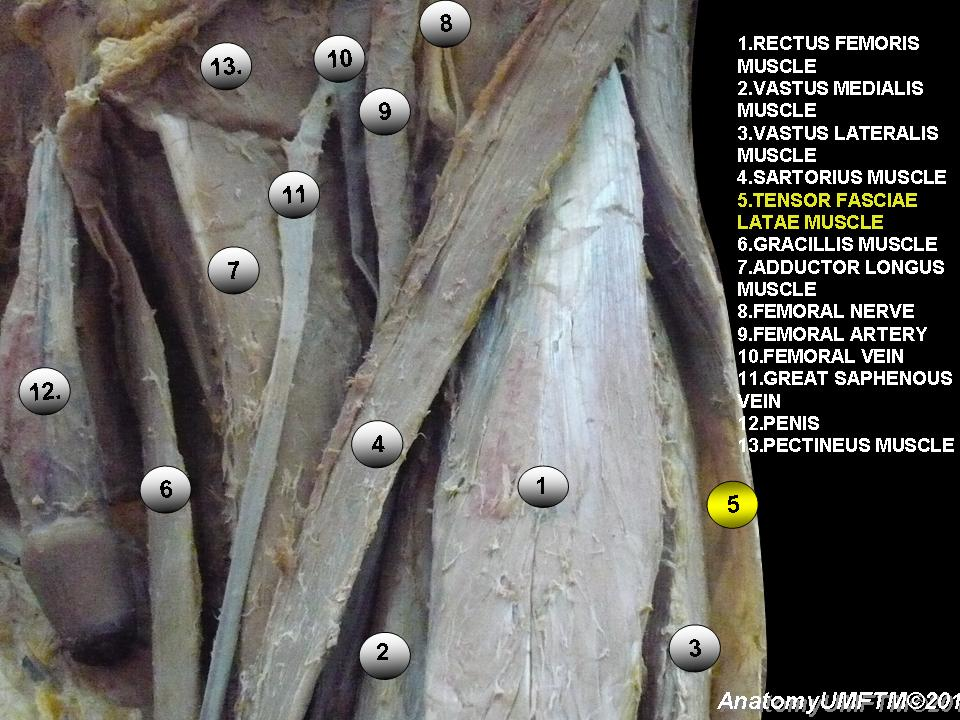
Tensor fasciae latae muscle

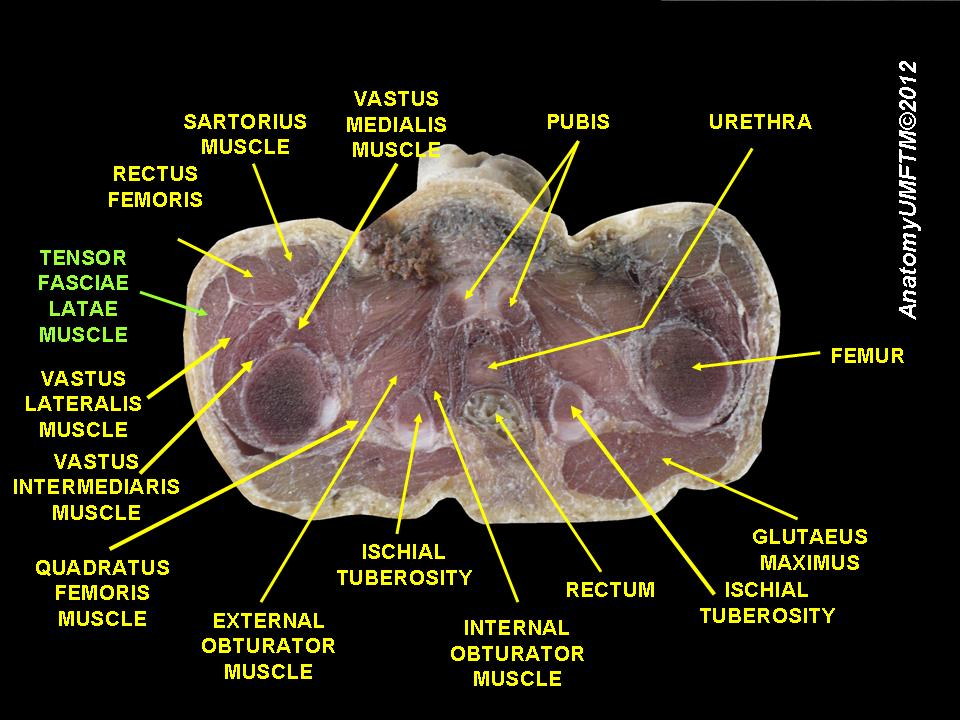
Tensor fasciae latae muscle
