= Lumbosacral plexus =

Neuroanatomical division

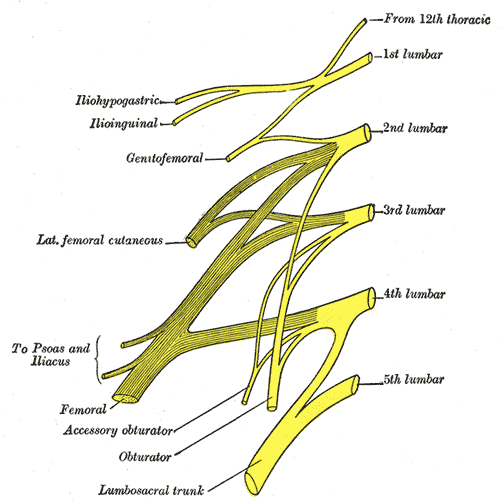
- Plan of lumbar plexus.

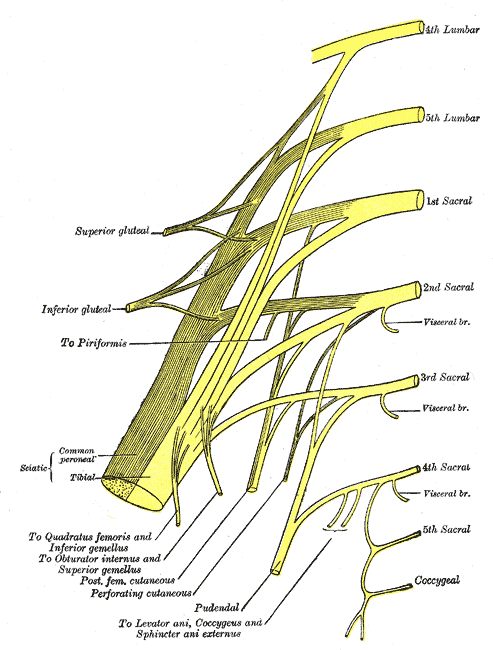
- Plan of sacral and pudendal plexuses.

Details

Identifiers
- Latin: plexus lumbosacralis
- MeSH: D008160
- TA98: A14.2.07.001
- TA2: 6516
- FMA: 5907

The anterior divisions of the lumbar nerves, sacral nerves, and coccygeal nerve form the lumbosacral plexus, the first lumbar nerve being frequently joined by a branch from the twelfth thoracic. For descriptive purposes this plexus is usually divided into three parts:

- lumbar plexus
- sacral plexus
- pudendal plexus

Injuries to the lumbosacral plexus are predominantly witnessed as bone injuries. Lumbosacral trunk and sacral plexus palsies are common injury patterns.

== Additional images ==
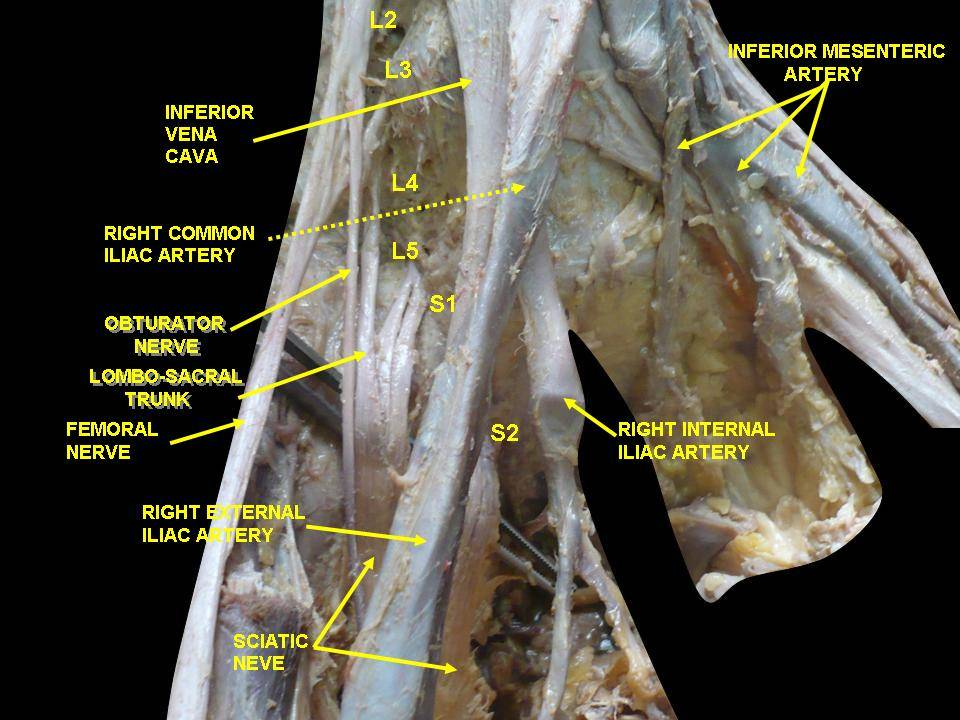
Lumbosacral plexus Deep dissection.

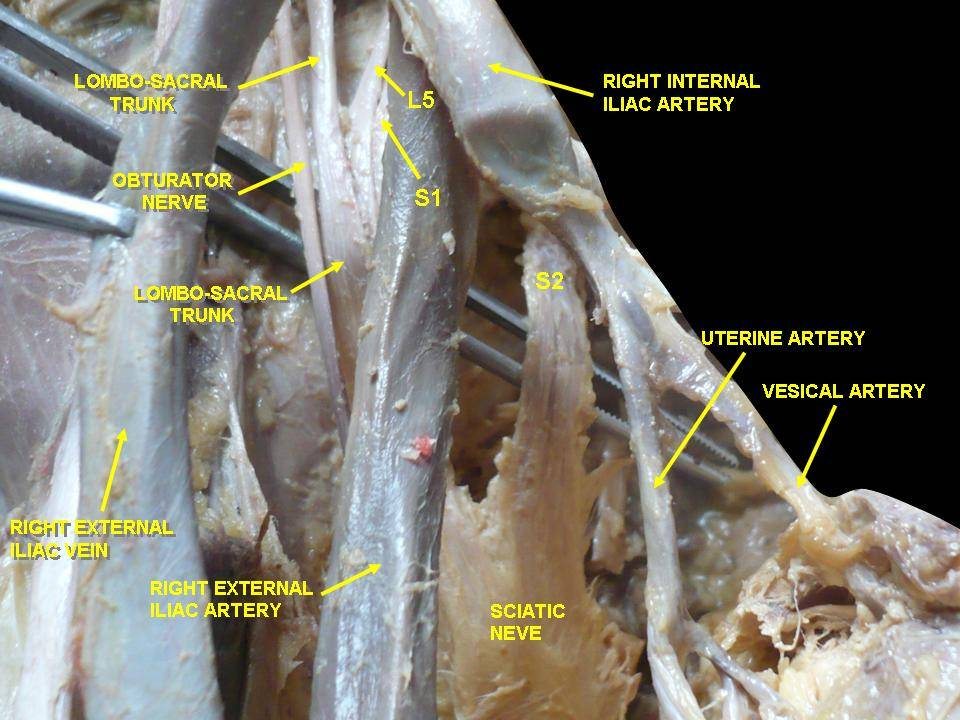
Lumbosacral plexus Deep dissection.
