= Ventral ramus of spinal nerve =

Anterior division of a spinal nerve

Ventral ramus
- The formation of the spinal nerve from the dorsal and ventral roots. (Ventral ramus labeled at lower left.)

Details

Identifiers
- Latin: ramus anterior nervi spinalis
- TA98: A14.2.00.034
- TA2: 6147
- FMA: 5982

The ventral ramus (pl.: rami) (Latin for 'branch') is the anterior division of a spinal nerve. The ventral rami supply the antero-lateral parts of the trunk and the limbs. They are mainly larger than the dorsal rami.

Shortly after a spinal nerve exits the intervertebral foramen, it branches into the dorsal ramus, the ventral ramus, and the ramus communicans. Each of these three structures carries both sensory and motor information. Each spinal nerve is a mixed nerve that carries both sensory and motor information, via efferent and afferent nerve fibers—ultimately via the motor cortex in the frontal lobe and to somatosensory cortex in the parietal lobe—but also through the phenomenon of reflex.

In the thoracic region they remain distinct from each other and each innervates a narrow strip of muscle and skin along the sides, chest, ribs, and abdominal wall. These rami are called the intercostal nerves. In regions other than the thoracic, ventral rami converge with each other to form networks of nerves called nerve plexuses. Within each plexus, fibers from the various ventral rami branch and become redistributed so that each nerve exiting the plexus has fibers from several different spinal nerves. One advantage to having plexes is that damage to a single spinal nerve will not completely paralyze a limb.

There are four main plexuses formed by the ventral rami: the cervical plexus contains ventral rami from spinal nerves C1–C4. Branches of the cervical plexus, which include the phrenic nerve, innervate muscles of the neck, the diaphragm, and the skin of the neck and upper chest. The brachial plexus contains ventral rami from spinal nerves C5–T1. This plexus innervates the pectoral girdle and upper limb. The lumbar plexus contains ventral rami from spinal nerves L1–L4. The sacral plexus contains ventral rami from spinal nerves L4–S4. The lumbar and sacral plexuses innervate the pelvic girdle and lower limbs.

Ventral rami, including the sinuvertebral nerve branches, also supply structures anterior to the facet joint, including the vertebral bodies, the discs and their ligaments, and joins other spinal nerves to form the lumbosacral plexus.
