= Anococcygeal nerve =

Nerve in the pelvis

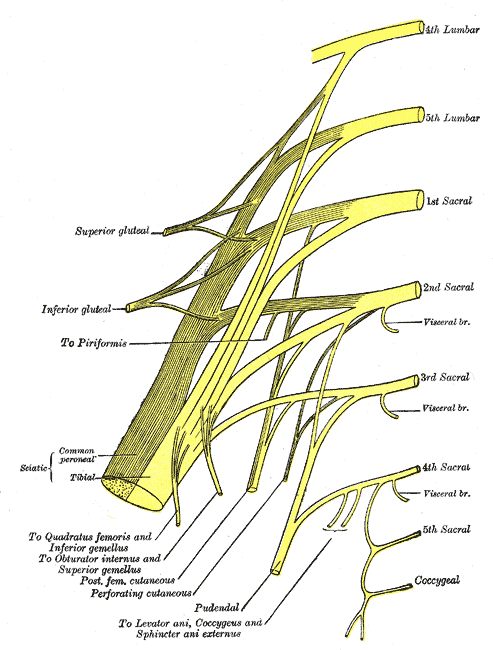
- Plan of sacral and pudendal plexuses (anococcygeal nerve not labeled, but visible at bottom right)

Details
- From: Coccygeal plexus

Identifiers
- Latin: nervus anococcygeus
- TA98: A14.2.07.045
- TA2: 6599
- FMA: 19038

The anococcygeal nerve is a sensory nerve of the pelvis that arises from the coccygeal plexus. It pierces the coccygeus muscle and the sacrotuberous ligament to supply a small area of skin between the coccyx and anus, as well as the sacrococcygeal joint. The number of anococcygeal nerves varies between one and three.

== See also ==
- Coccygeal plexus
- Coccydynia (coccyx pain, tailbone pain)
