= Superior gluteal nerve =

Nerve on the pelvis and leg

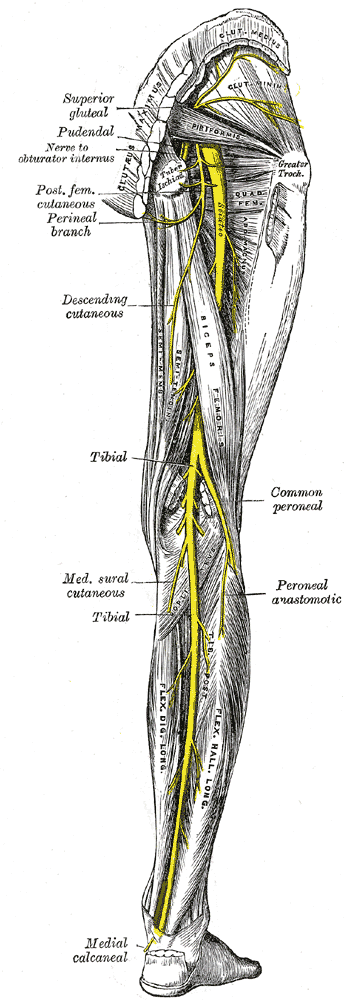
- Nerves of the right lower extremity. Posterior view.

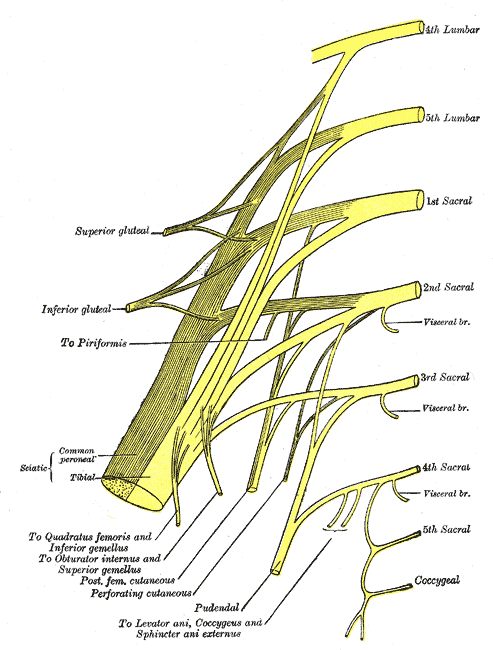
- Plan of sacral and pudendal plexuses. (Superior gluteal labeled at upper left.)

Details
- From: Sacral plexus (L4-S1)
- Innervates: Gluteus medius, gluteus minimus, tensor fasciæ latæ

Identifiers
- Latin: nervus gluteus superior
- TA98: A14.2.07.031
- TA2: 6543
- FMA: 16510

The superior gluteal nerve is a mixed (motor and sensory) nerve of the sacral plexus that originates in the pelvis. It provides motor innervation to the gluteus medius, gluteus minimus, tensor fasciae latae; it also has a cutaneous branch.

== Structure ==
=== Origin ===
The superior gluteal nerve originates in the sacral plexus. It arises from the posterior divisions of L4, L5 and S1.

=== Course ===
It exits the pelvis through the greater sciatic foramen superior to the piriformis muscle. It is accompanied by the superior gluteal artery and the superior gluteal vein.

It passes lateral-ward in between the gluteus medius muscle and the gluteus minimus muscle, accompanied by the deep branch of the superior gluteal artery. It divides into a superior branch and an inferior branch.

The inferior branch continues to pass between the two muscles to end in the tensor fasciae latae muscle.

=== Distribution ===
==== Motor ====
- tensor fasciae latae muscle
- gluteus medius muscle (superior branch and inferior branch)
- gluteus minimus muscle (inferior branch, sometimes superior branch as well)
- piriformis muscle

==== Sensory ====
The superior gluteal nerve also has a cutaneous branch.

== Clinical significance ==
=== Gait ===
In normal gait, the small gluteal muscles on the stance side can stabilize the pelvis in the coronal plane. Weakness or paralysis of these muscles caused by a damaged superior gluteal nerve can result in a weak abduction in the affected hip joint. This gait disturbance is known as Trendelenburg gait. In a positive Trendelenburg's sign the pelvis sags toward the normal unsupported side (the swing leg). The opposite, when the pelvis is elevated on the swing side, is known as Duchenne limp. Bilateral loss of the small gluteal muscles results in a waddling gait.

=== Iatrogenic damage ===
The superior gluteal nerve may be damaged by intramuscular injections and nephrectomy.

== See also ==
- Inferior gluteal nerve
- Trendelenburg's sign
