= Gluteal sulcus =

Fold separating the thigh from the buttock

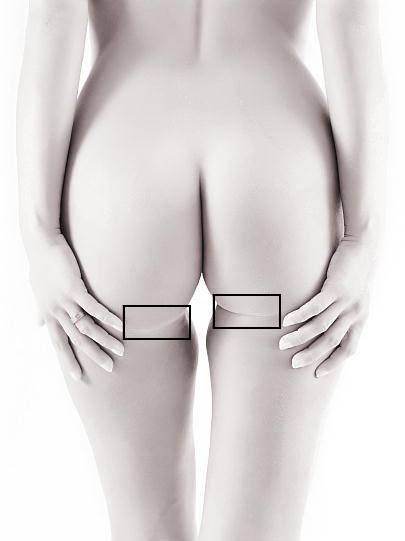

Details
- Nerve: Perforating cutaneous nerve

Identifiers
- Latin: sulcus glutaeus, ruga glutaea horizontalis
- TA98: A01.2.08.004
- TA2: 315
- FMA: 20233

The gluteal sulcus (also known as the gluteal fold, tuck, fold of the buttock, horizontal gluteal crease, or gluteal furrow) is an area of the body of humans and anthropoid apes, described by a horizontal crease formed by the inferior aspect of the buttocks and the posterior upper thigh. The gluteal sulcus is formed by the posterior horizontal skin crease of the hip joint and overlying fat and is not formed by the lower border of the gluteus maximus muscle, which crosses the fold obliquely. It is one of the major defining features of the buttocks. Children with developmental dysplasia of the hips are born with uneven gluteal folds and can be diagnosed with a physical examination and sonogram.

== Gluteal muscles ==
The gluteal muscles can be classified into two main groups: The superficial gluteal muscles are responsible for extension and abduction of the hip as well as stabilizing and maintaining the balance of the pelvis during the gait cycle. Deep gluteal muscles control external rotation of the extended hip and abduction of the flexed hip.

== Clinical relevance ==
The superolateral region, which is free of nerves and vessels, is used for intramuscular injections. The Trendelenburg gait, consisting of gluteus medius and minimus muscles, is essential to maintaining the balance of the pelvis during the gait cycle. The piriformis syndrome, which is also called deep gluteal syndrome or gluteal pain syndrome, is the pain or numbness in the posterior thigh, the buttock, and the hip, with radiation or radicular pain in the sciatic nerve distribution. This condition may be caused by trauma, hematoma, excessive sitting, and anatomic variations of the muscle and nerve. Superior gluteal nerve palsy causes injury to the superior gluteal nerve, which results in motor loss that manifests as a disabling gluteus medius limp. The most common cause is an iatrogenic injury during hip surgery or an intramuscular injection. Lesions of the inferior gluteal nerve occur through iatrogenic injuries like surgery, trauma, hernias, or pelvic tumors. This condition may result in a functional deficiency of the gluteus maximus muscle, leading to difficulties climbing the stairs or standing up from a chair, also known as the gluteus maximus lurch.
