= Mixed nerve =

Nerve with sensory and motor fibers

A mixed nerve is any nerve that contains both sensory (afferent) and motor (efferent) nerve fibers. All 31 pairs of spinal nerves are mixed nerves. Four of the twelve cranial nerves – V, VII, IX and X are mixed nerves.

== Examples ==
=== Spinal nerves ===
The 31 pairs of spinal nerves are mixed.

- 8 cervical nerves
- 12 thoracic nerves
- 5 lumbar nerves
- 5 sacral nerves
- 1 coccygeal nerve

=== Cranial nerves ===
Four of the cranial nerves are mixed nerves.

- Trigeminal nerve (CN V)
- Facial nerve (CN VII)
- Glossopharyngeal nerve (CN IX)
- Vagus nerve (CN X)
