= Sacral spinal nerve 3 =

Sacral spinal nerve
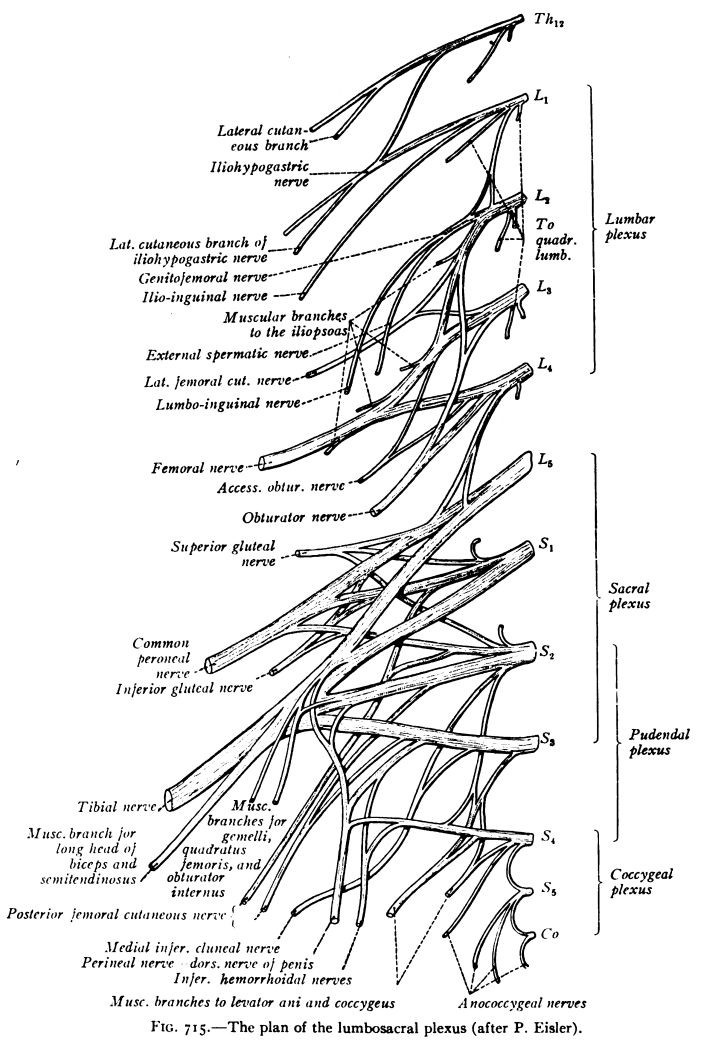
- The plan of the lumbosacral plexus

Details

Identifiers
- Latin: nervi spinalis
- FMA: 6425

The sacral spinal nerve 3 (S3) is a spinal nerve of the sacral segment.

It originates from the spinal column from below the 3rd body of the sacrum.

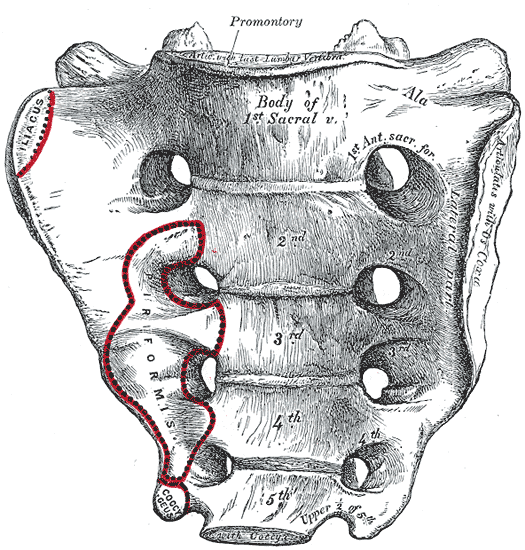
Sacrum, showing bodies in center.

== Muscles ==
S3 supplies many muscles, either directly or through nerves originating from S3. They are not innervated with S3 as single origin, but partly by S3 and partly by other spinal nerves. The muscles are:

- iliococcygeus
- puborectalis
- coccygeus
- sphincter urethrae membranaceae
- superior gemellus
- levator ani

== Additional images ==
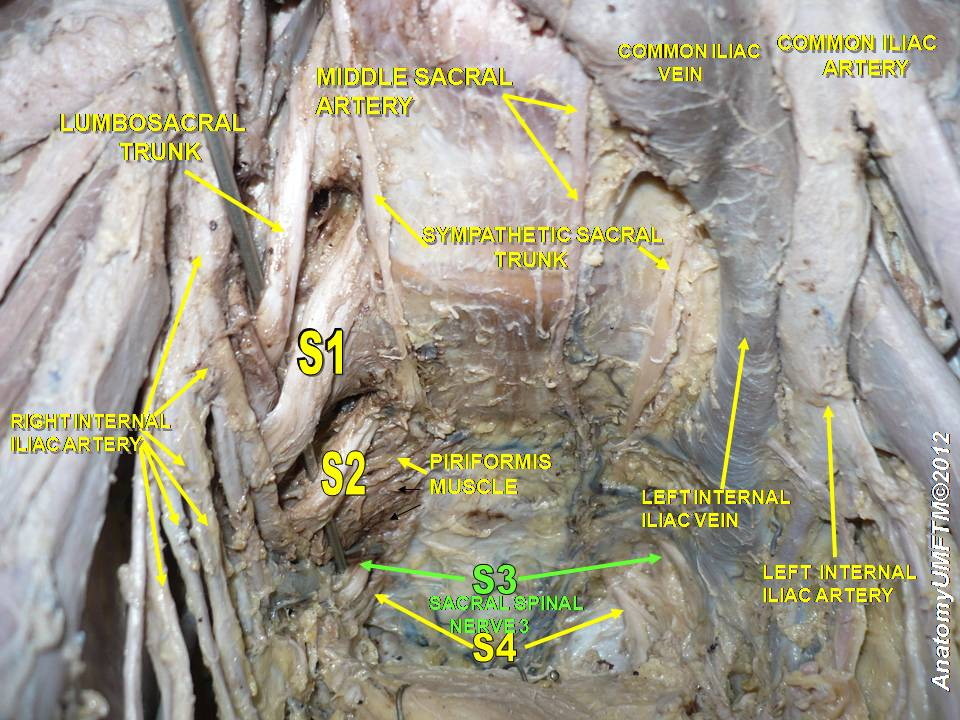
Sacral spinal nerve 3
