= Lumbosacral trunk =

Nervous tissue that connects the lumbar plexus with the sacral plexus

- Plan of lumbar plexus.

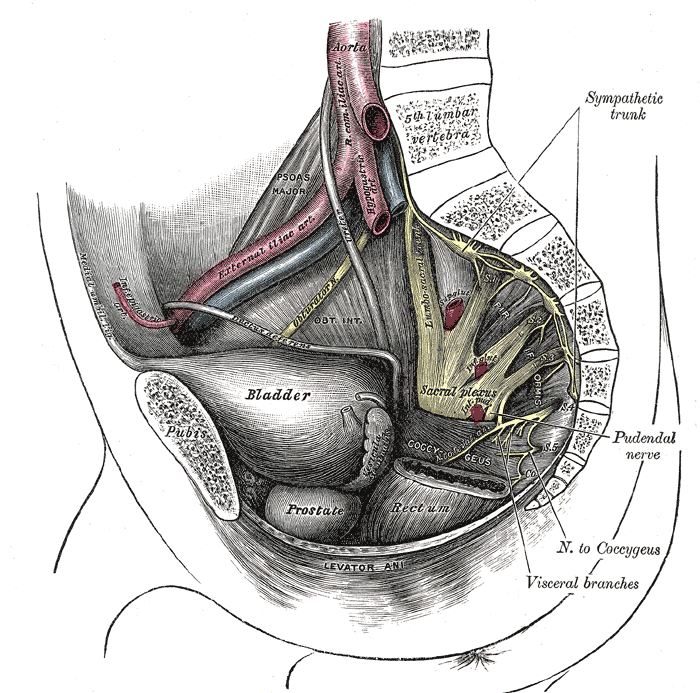
- Dissection of side wall of pelvis showing sacral and pudendal plexuses.

Details
- From: L4-L5

Identifiers
- Latin: truncus lumbosacralis
- TA98: A14.2.07.026
- TA2: 6504
- FMA: 65535

The lumbosacral trunk is nervous tissue that connects the lumbar plexus with the sacral plexus. It is formed by the union of parts of the fourth and fifth lumbar nerves and descends to join the sacral plexus.

== Anatomy ==
The lumbosacral trunk is formed by the union of the entire anterior ramus of lumbar nerve L5 and a part of L4. L4 first issues its branches to the lumbar plexus, then emerges from the medial border of the psoas muscle to unite with the anterior ramus of L5 just superior to the pelvic brim to form the thick, cord-like trunk which crosses the pelvic brim (medial to the obturator nerve) to descend upon the anterior surface of the ala of sacrum before joining the sacral plexus.

Like the sacral nerves, the lumbosacral trunks splits into an anterior division and a posterior division before recombining to form nerves for the flexor and extensor compartments of the lower limb.

== Clinical significance ==
The lumbosacral trunk may be compressed by the fetal head during the second stage of labour. This causes some muscle weakness in the legs. A full recovery is usually expected.

== Additional images ==
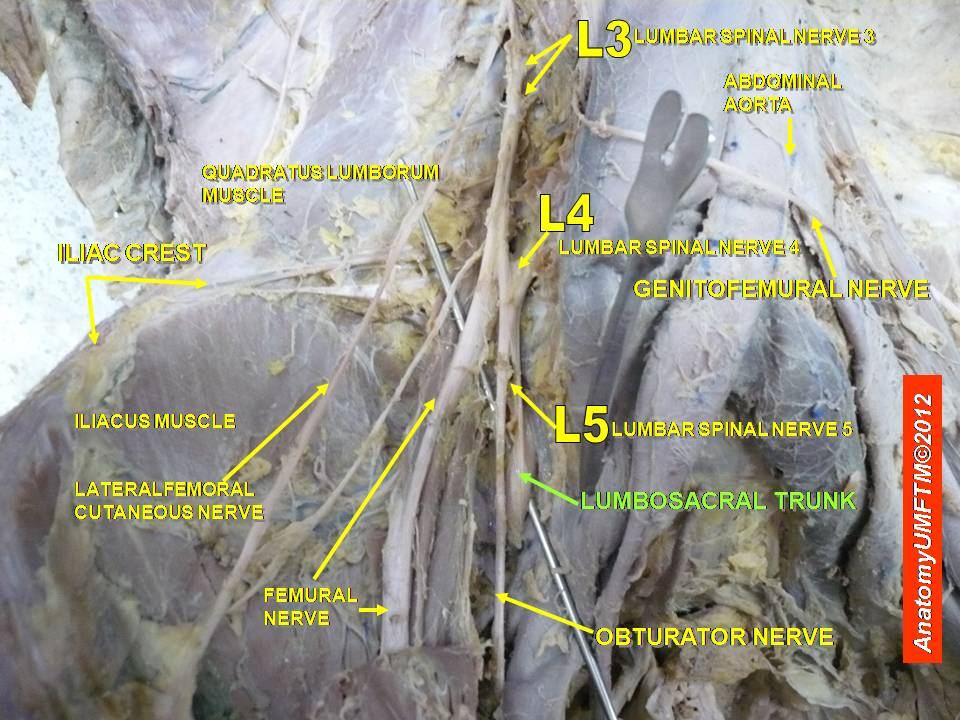
Lumbosacral trunk

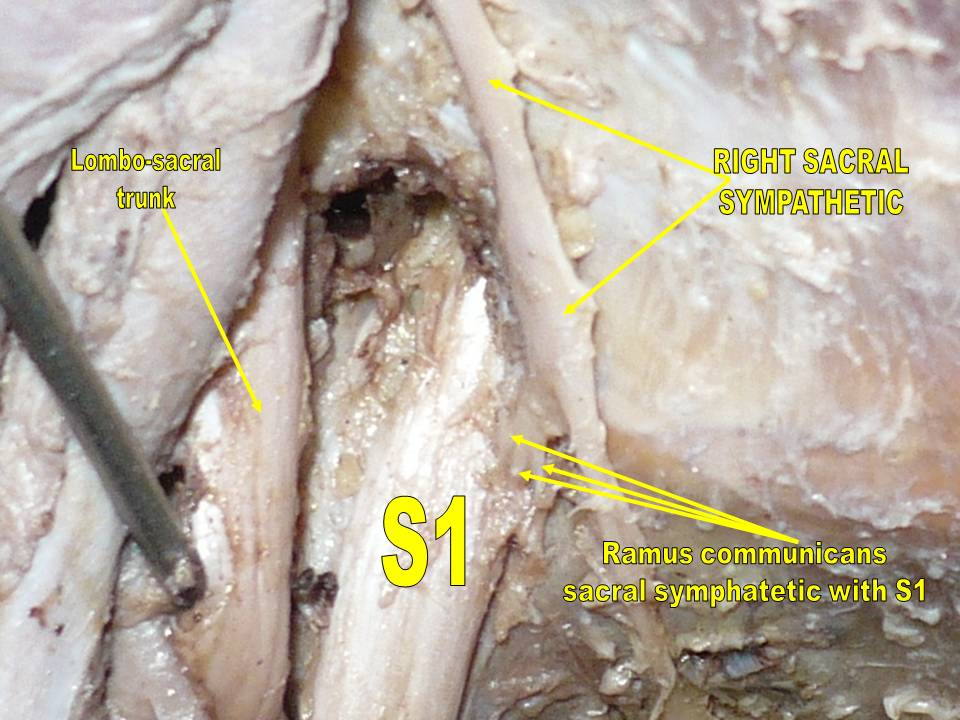
Ramus communicans.Sacral symphatetic with S1.
