= Pudendal plexus (nerves) =

Group of nerves of the lower abdomen

The pudendal plexus is a term used for a compound structure consisting of sacral spinal nerves.

Some sources describe it as S2-S4 of the lumbosacral plexus.

In some older texts, it is a rough approximation of the coccygeal plexus.
