= Quadratus femoris muscle =

One of six small hip muscles in the lateral rotator group

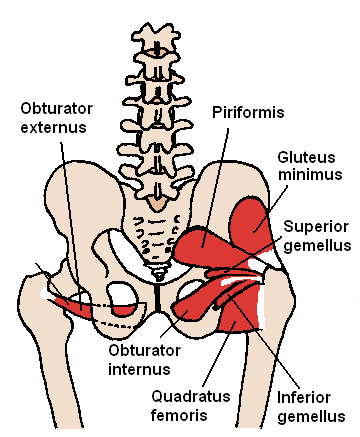
- The quadratus femoris and nearby muscles

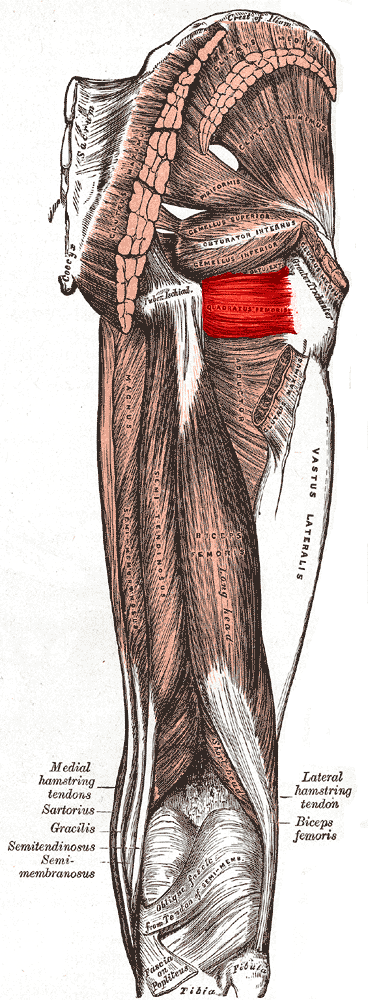
- Muscles of the gluteal and posterior femoral regions with quadratus femoris muscle highlighted

Details
- Origin: Ischial tuberosity
- Insertion: Intertrochanteric crest
- Artery: Inferior gluteal artery, medial circumflex femoral artery
- Nerve: Nerve to quadratus femoris (L4-S1)
- Actions: Lateral rotation and adduction of thigh

Identifiers
- Latin: musculus quadratus femoris
- TA98: A04.7.02.015
- TA2: 2608
- FMA: 22321

The quadratus femoris is a flat, quadrilateral skeletal muscle. Located on the posterior side of the hip joint, it is a strong external rotator and adductor of the thigh, but also acts to stabilize the femoral head in the acetabulum. The quadratus femoris is used in Meyer's muscle pedicle grafting to prevent avascular necrosis of femur head.

== Course ==
It originates on the lateral border of the ischial tuberosity of the ischium of the pelvis. From there, it passes laterally to its insertion on the posterior side of the head of the femur: the quadrate tubercle on the intertrochanteric crest and along the quadrate line, the vertical line which runs downward to bisect the lesser trochanter on the medial side of the femur. Along its course, quadratus is aligned edge to edge with the inferior gemellus above and the adductor magnus below, so that its upper and lower borders run horizontal and parallel.

At its origin, the upper margin of the adductor magnus is separated from it by the terminal branches of the medial femoral circumflex vessels.

A bursa is often found between the front of this muscle and the lesser trochanter.

== Clinical significance ==
Groin pain can be a disabling ailment with many potential root causes: one such cause, often overlooked, is quadratus femoris tendinitis. Magnetic resonance imaging can show abnormal signal intensity at the insertion of the right quadratus femoris tendon, which suggests inflammation of the area. Since the muscle works to laterally rotate and adduct the femur, actions involving the lower body can strain the muscle. In addition, patients present with hip pain and an increased signal intensity of the MRI of the quadratus femoris have been shown to also have a significantly narrower ischiofemoral space compared to the general populace. The ischiofemoral impingement may be a cause of the hip pain associated with quadratus femoris tendinitis.

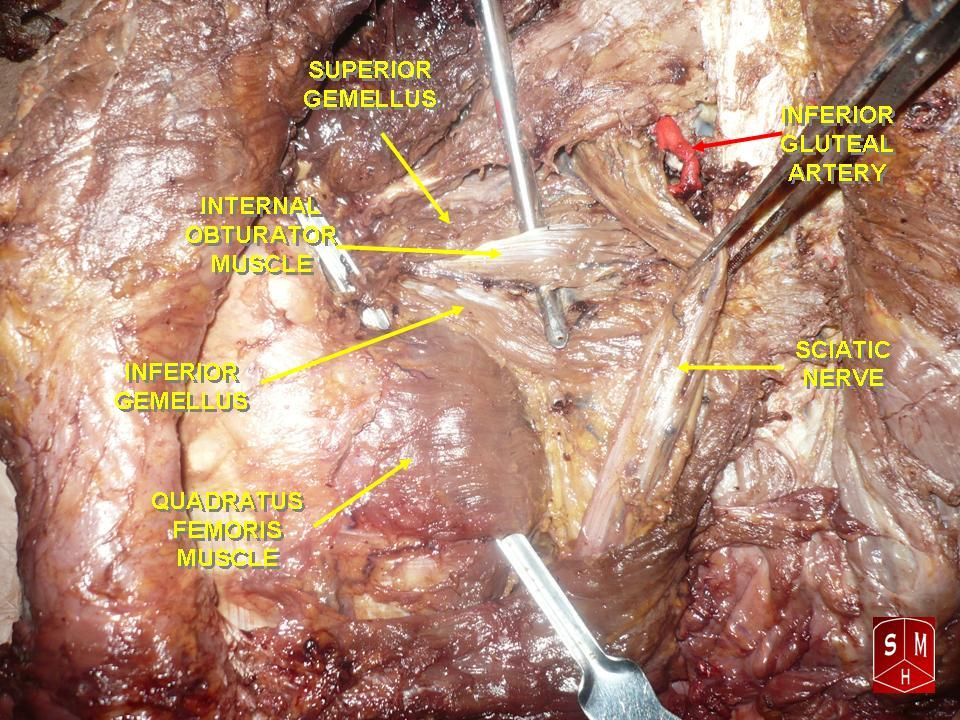
Quadratus femoris muscle

== Additional images ==
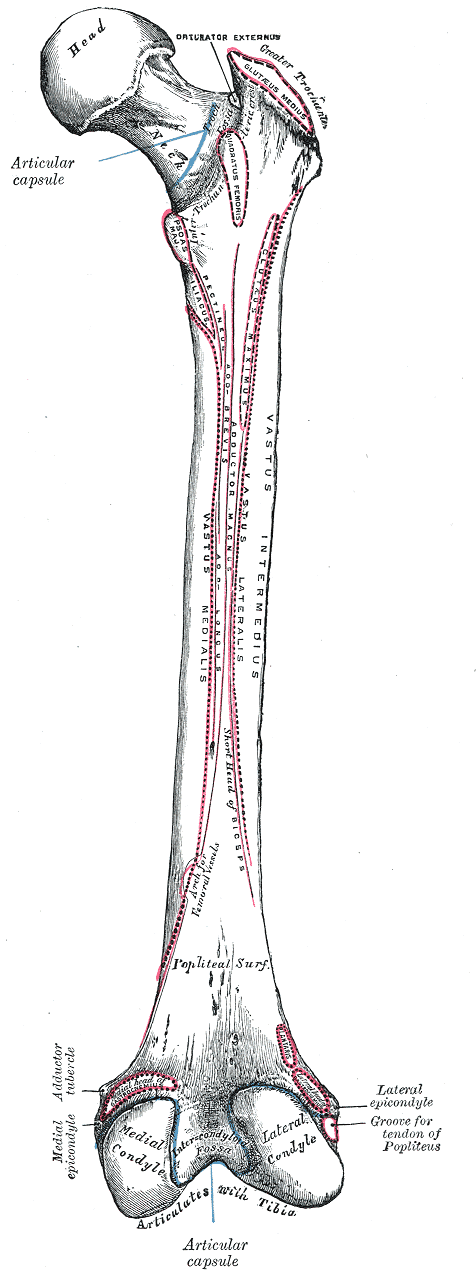
Right femur. Posterior surface.

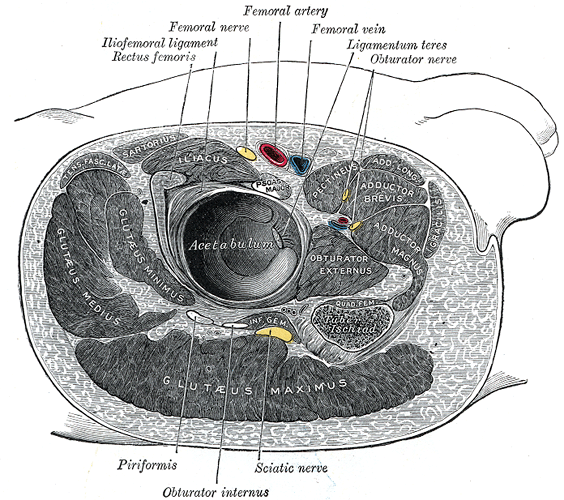
Structures surrounding right hip-joint.

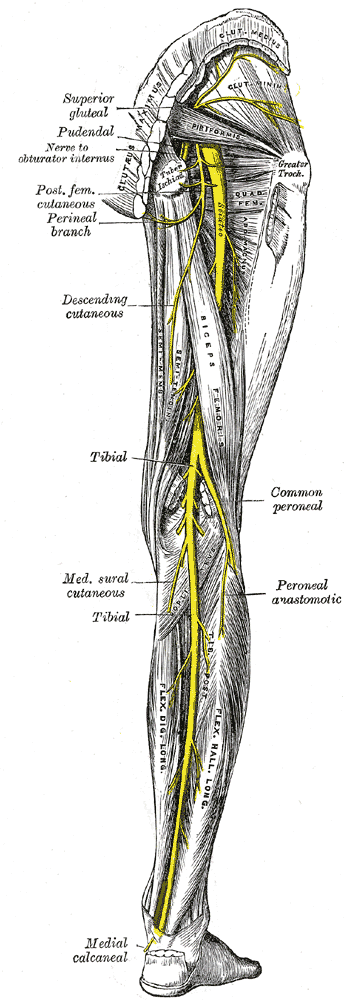
Nerves of the right lower extremity Posterior view.

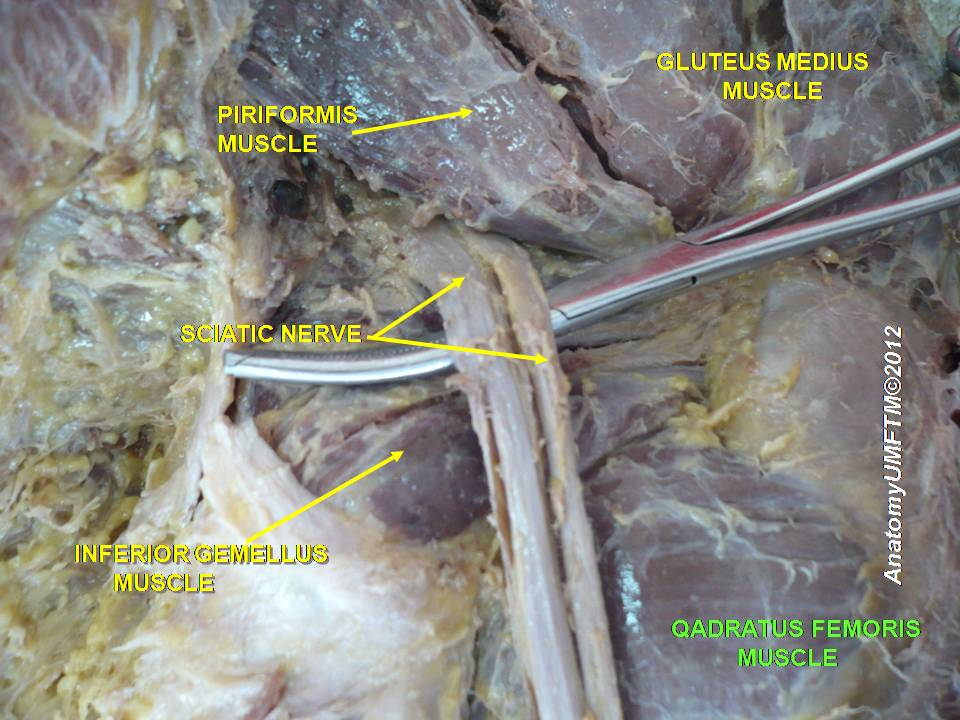
Quadratus femoris muscle

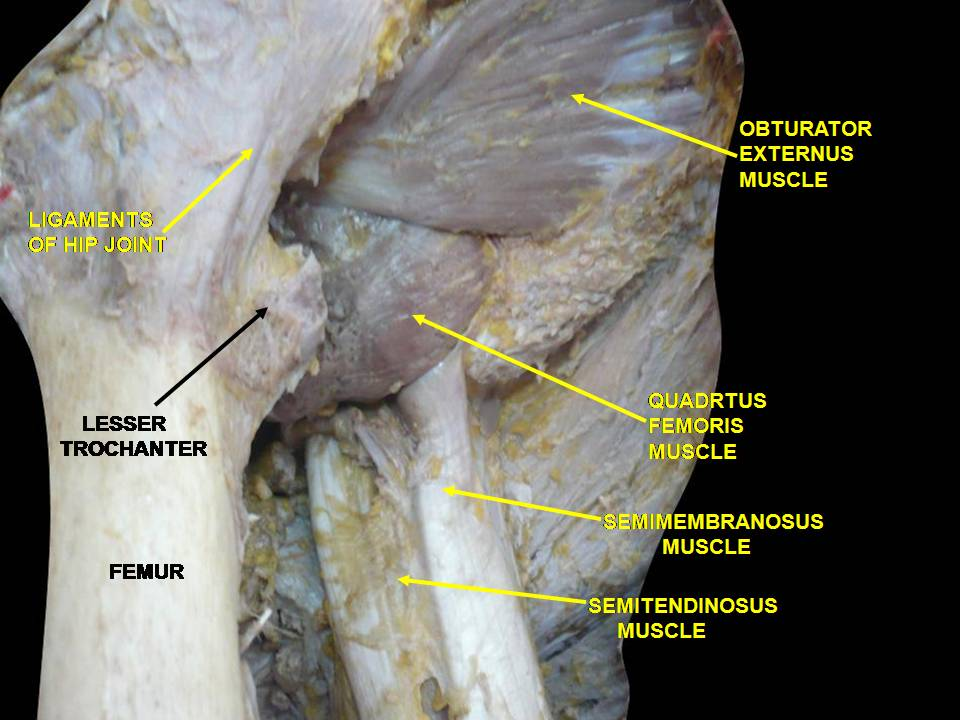
Muscles of Thigh. Anterior views.
