= Sciatic notch =

Sciatic notch may refer to:

- Greater sciatic notch
- Lesser sciatic notch
