= Nerve to obturator internus =

Human nerve

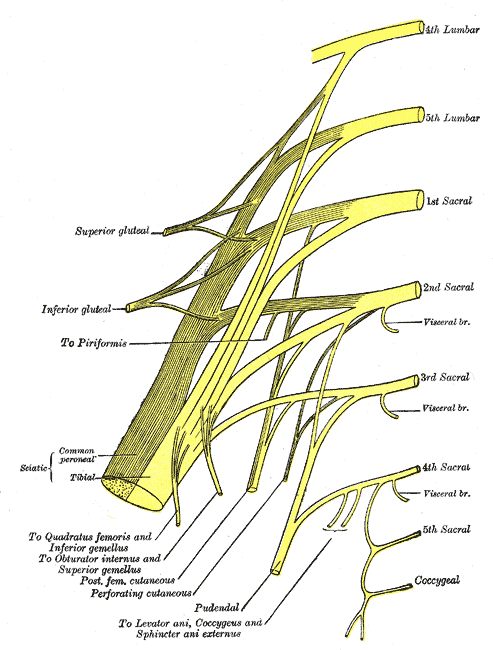
- Plan of sacral plexus and pudendal plexus (nerve to the obturator internus and gemellus superior labeled at lower left)

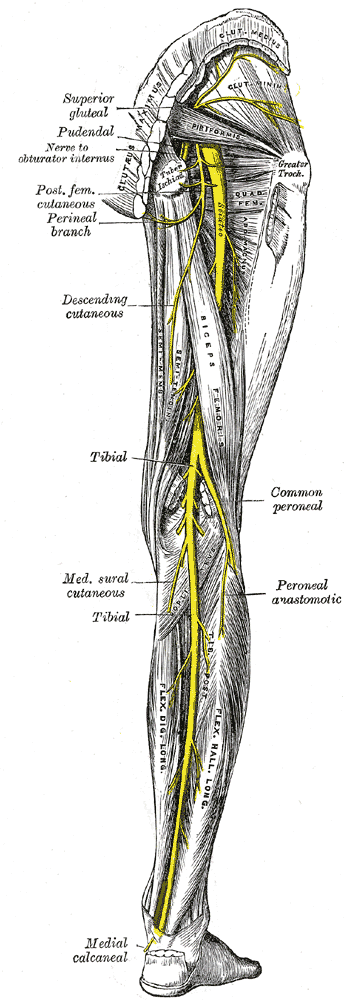
- Nerves of the right leg seen from behind (nerve to the obturator internus labeled at upper left)

Details
- From: Sacral plexus
- Innervates: Obturator internus and gemellus superior muscles

Identifiers
- Latin: nervus musculi obturatorii interni
- TA98: A14.2.07.028
- TA2: 6550
- FMA: 78711

The nerve to obturator internus (also known as the obturator internus nerve) is a mixed (sensory and motor) nerve providing motor innervation to the obturator internus muscle and gemellus superior muscle, and sensory innervation to the hip joint. It is a branch of the sacral plexus. It is one of the group of deep gluteal nerves.

It exits the pelvis through the greater sciatic foramen to innervate the gemellus superior muscle, then re-enters the pelvis to innervate the obturator internus muscle.

== Structure ==
=== Origin ===
The nerve to obturator internus is a branch of the lumbosacral plexus. It arises from the anterior divisions of (the anterior rami of) L5-S2.

=== Course and relations ===
It emerges inferior to the piriformis muscle and exits the pelvis through the greater sciatic foramen. It travels round the base of the ischial spine lateral to the internal pudendal artery and nerve, and - while doing so - issues a branch to the gemellus superior, which enters the upper part of the posterior surface of the muscle. It then re-enters the pelvis through the lesser sciatic foramen to innervate the obturator internus muscle, piercing the pelvic surface of this muscle.

== See also ==
- Obturator nerve
- Nerve to quadratus femoris
