= Sciatic foramina =

Sciatic foramen can refer to:

- Greater sciatic foramen (foramen ischiadicum majus)
- Lesser sciatic foramen (foramen ischiadicum minus)
