= Femoral neck =

Aspect of human anatomy

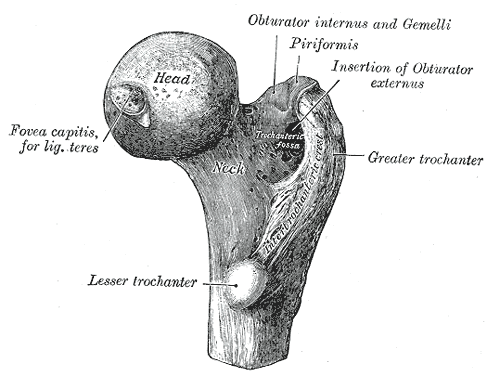
- Upper extremity of right femur viewed from behind and above.

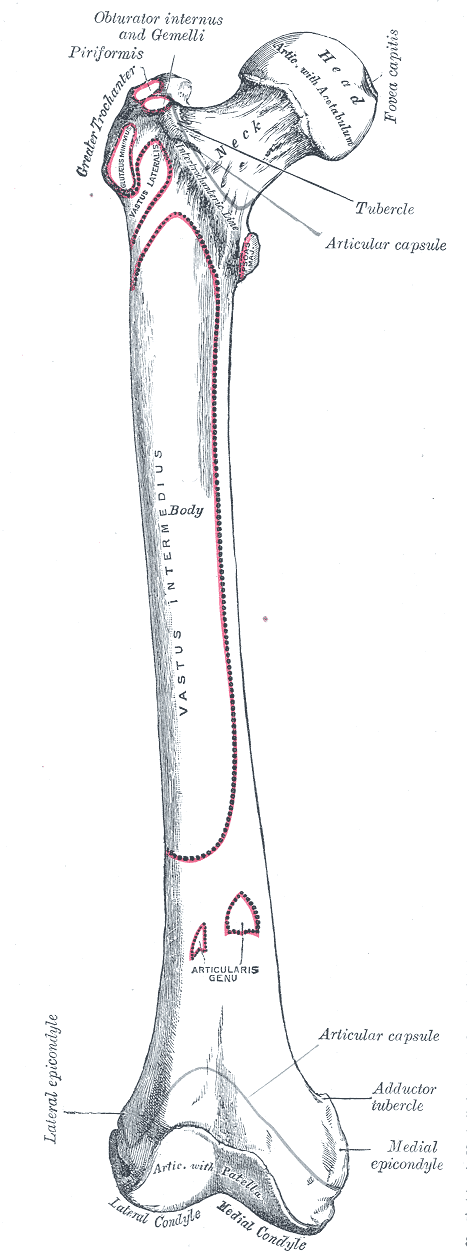
- Right femur. Anterior surface.

Details

Identifiers
- Latin: collum femoris
- MeSH: D005272
- TA98: A02.5.04.004
- TA2: 1363
- FMA: 42385

The femoral neck (also femur neck or neck of the femur) is a flattened pyramidal process of bone, connecting the femoral head with the femoral shaft, and forming with the latter a wide angle opening medialward.

== Structure ==
The neck is flattened from before backward, contracted in the middle, and broader laterally than medially.

The vertical diameter of the lateral half is increased by the obliquity of the lower edge, which slopes downward to join the body at the level of the lesser trochanter, so that it measures one-third more than the antero-posterior diameter.

The medial half is smaller and of a more circular shape.

The anterior surface of the neck is perforated by numerous vascular foramina.

Along the upper part of the line of junction of the anterior surface with the head is a shallow groove, best marked in elderly subjects; this groove lodges the orbicular fibers of the capsule of the hip joint.

The posterior surface is smooth, and is broader and more concave than the anterior: the posterior part of the capsule of the hip-joint is attached to it about 1 cm above the intertrochanteric crest.

The superior border is short and thick, and ends laterally at the greater trochanter; its surface is perforated by large foramina.

The inferior border, long and narrow, curves a little backward, to end at the lesser trochanter.

=== Angle of inclination ===
The angle is widest in infancy, and becomes lessened during growth, so that at puberty it forms a gentle curve from the axis of the body of the bone. In the adult, the neck forms an angle of about 125° with the body, but this varies in inverse proportion to the development of the pelvis and the stature. The angle decreases during the period of growth, but after full growth has been attained it does not usually undergo any change, even in old age; it varies considerably in different persons of the same age. Coxa vara is a deformity of the hip, whereby the angle between the head and the shaft of the femur is reduced to less than 120 degrees. Its opposite is coxa valga.

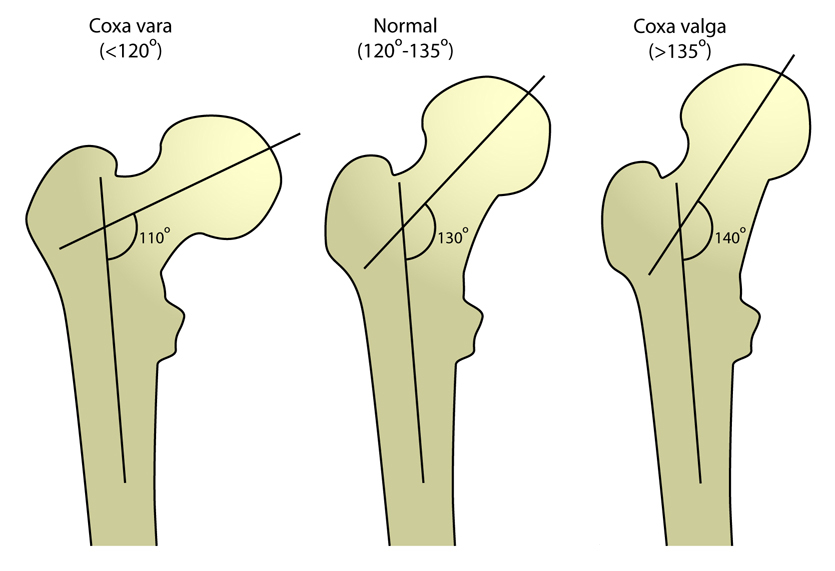
Designations of abnormal femur angles.

In the female, in consequence of the increased width of the pelvis, the neck of the femur forms more nearly a right angle with the body than it does in the male.

It is smaller in short than in long bones, and when the pelvis is wide.

In addition to projecting upward and medialward from the body of the femur, the neck also projects somewhat forward; the amount of this forward projection is extremely variable, but on an average is from 12° to 14°.

== Fracture ==
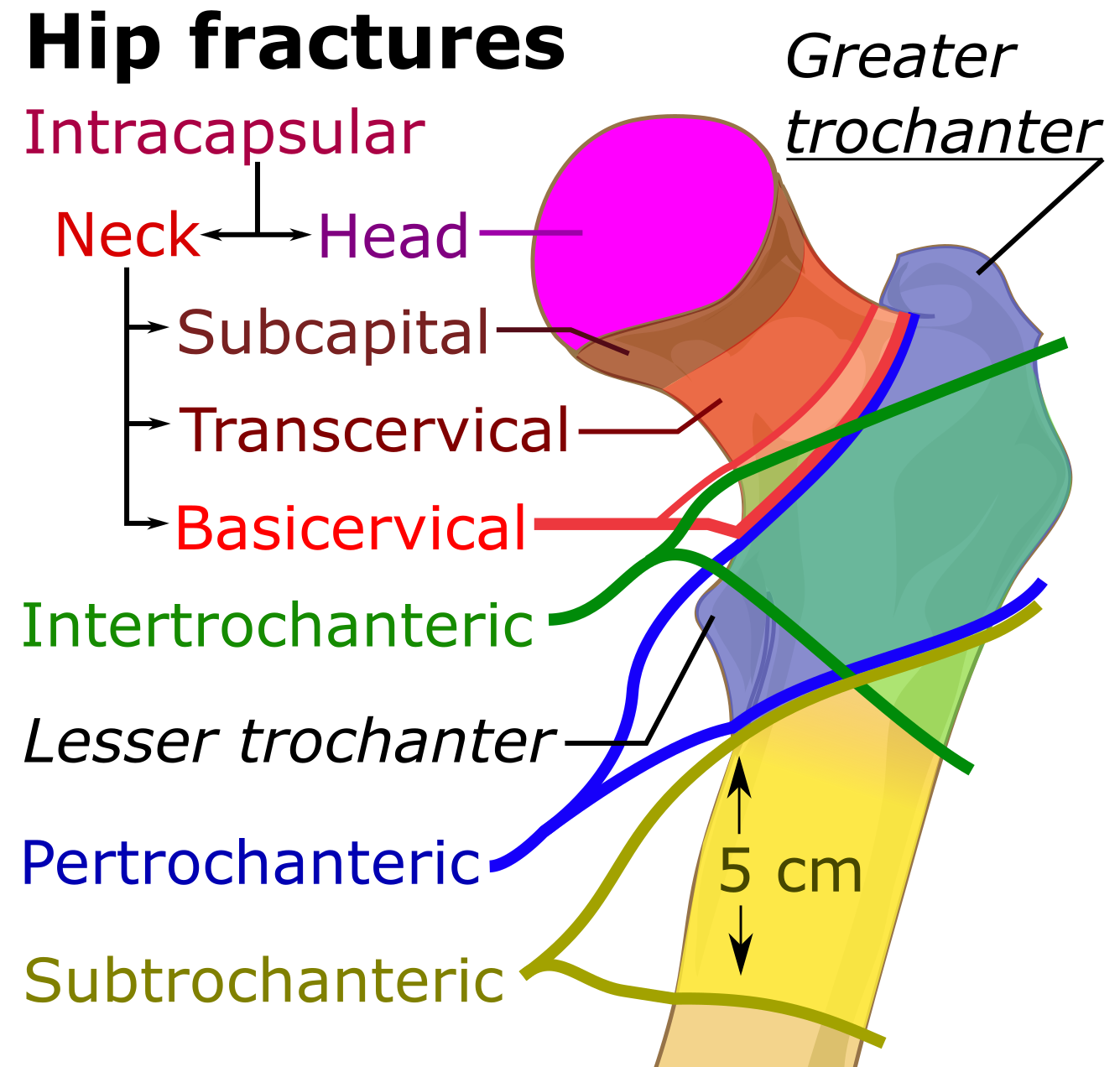
Hip fracture classification. "Neck" is labeled near top.

A fracture of the femoral neck is classified as a type of hip fracture. It is often due to osteoporosis; in the vast majority of cases, a hip fracture is a fragility fracture due to a fall or minor trauma in someone with weakened osteoporotic bone. Most hip fractures in people with normal bone are the result of high-energy trauma such as car accidents, falling from heights, or sports injuries.

Garden classification of femoral neck fractures.
Types	Description
1	Incomplete stable fracture with impaction in valgus
2	Complete but non displaced with two group of trabeculae in line
3	completely displaced with varus with all three trabeculae disturb.
4	Completely displaced with no contact between the fracture fragments

For low-grade fractures (Garden types 1 and 2), standard treatment is fixation of the fracture in situ with screws or a sliding screw/plate device. In elderly patients with displaced or intracapsular fractures many surgeons prefer to undertake a hemiarthroplasty, replacing the broken part of the bone with a metal implant. In elderly patients who are medically well and still active, a total hip replacement may be indicated.

== Additional images ==
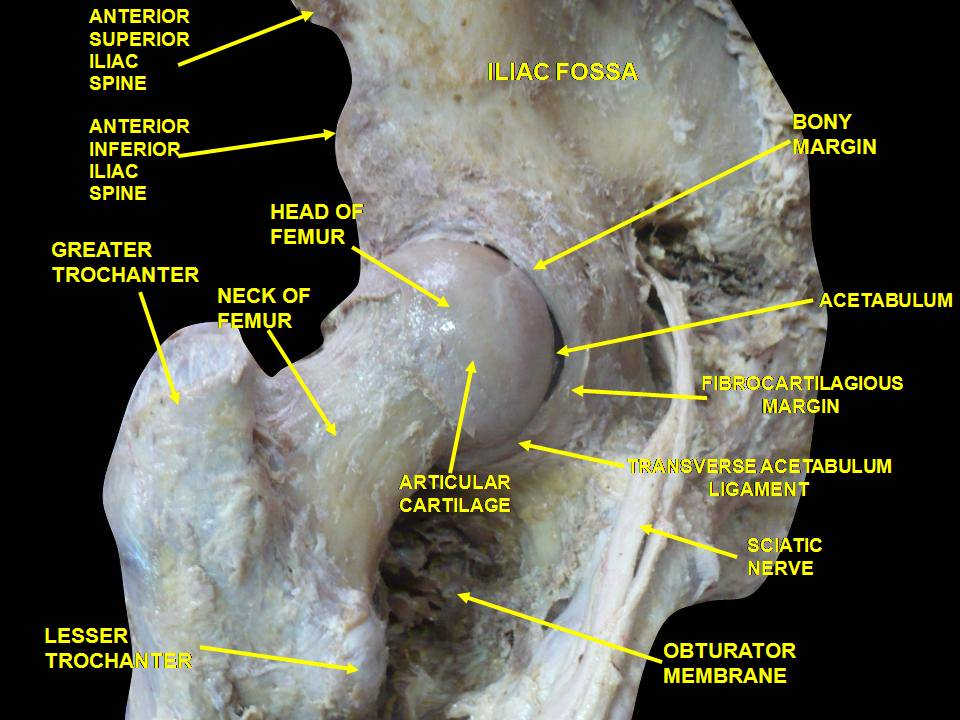
Hip joint. Lateral view. Femoral neck

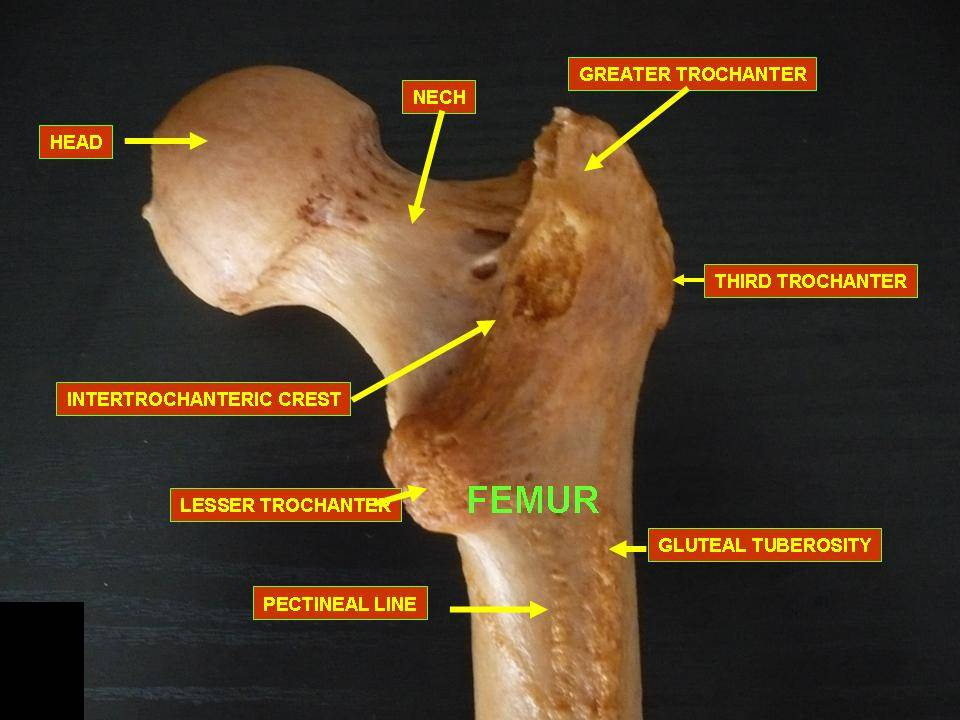
Femoral neck. Posterior view.
