= Tubercle of the femur =

Tubercle of the femur can refer to:

- Quadrate tubercle
- Adductor tubercle of femur
