= Extremity of femur =

Extremity of femur may refer to:

- Lower extremity of femur
- Upper extremity of femur
