= Lesser sciatic foramen =

Opening between pelvis and thigh in human anatomy

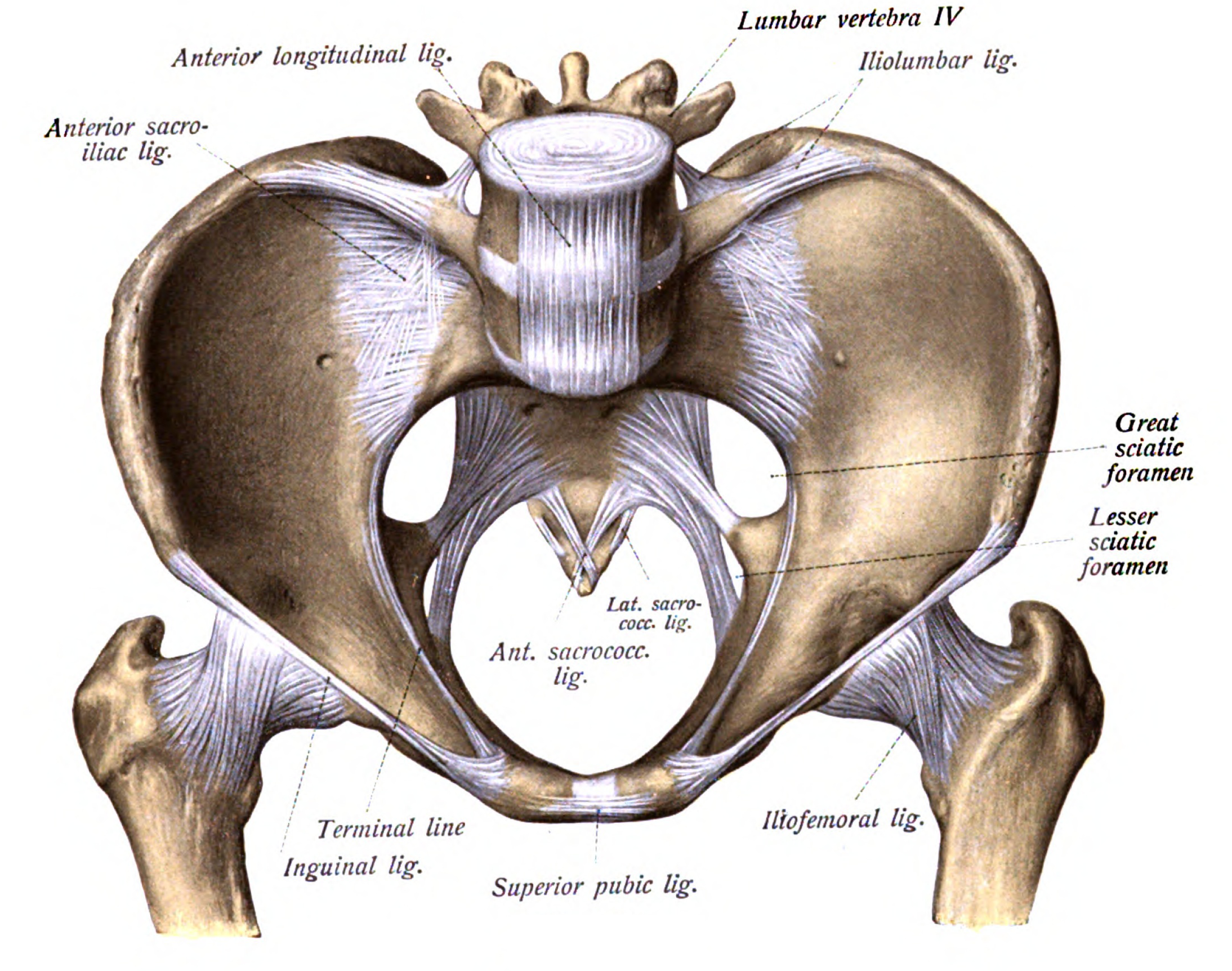
- Image of the pelvis showing the lesser sciatic foramen

Details

Identifiers
- Latin: foramen ischiadicum minus
- TA98: A03.6.03.009
- TA2: 1345
- FMA: 17035

The lesser sciatic foramen is an opening (foramen) between the pelvis and the back of the thigh. The foramen is formed by the sacrotuberous ligament which runs between the sacrum and the ischial tuberosity and the sacrospinous ligament which runs between the sacrum and the ischial spine.

== Structure ==
The lesser sciatic foramen has the following boundaries:

- Anterior: the tuberosity of the ischium
- Superior: the spine of the ischium and sacrospinous ligament
- Posterior: the sacrotuberous ligament

Alternatively, the foramen can be defined by the boundaries of the lesser sciatic notch and the two ligaments.

== Function ==
Pudendal nerve and its course through the lesser sciatic foramen

The following pass through the foramen:

- the tendon of the obturator internus
- internal pudendal vessels
- pudendal nerve
- nerve to the obturator internus

== See also ==
- Greater sciatic foramen
