= Trochanter =

Protrusion of the femur (bone)

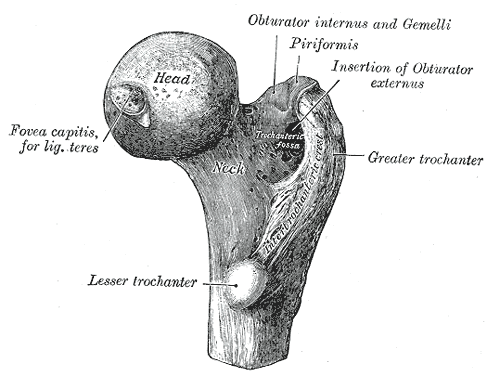
- Upper part of right femur viewed from behind and above, showing greater and lesser trochanter

Details

Identifiers
- Latin: trochanter
- FMA: 82513

A trochanter is a tubercle of the femur near its joint with the hip bone. In humans and most mammals, the trochanters serve as important muscle attachment sites. Humans have two, sometimes three, trochanters.

== Etymology ==
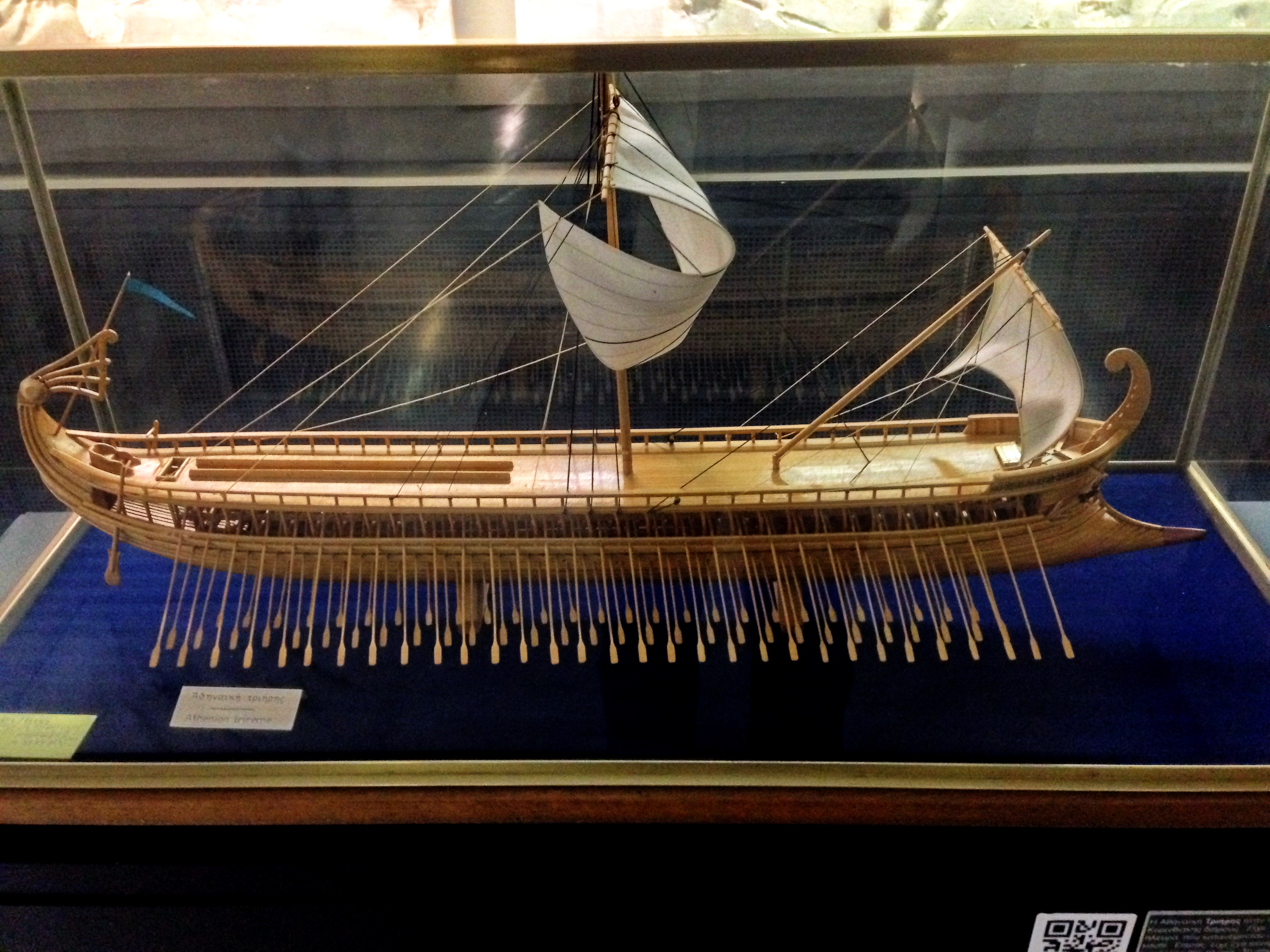
Ancient Greek triremes – three rows of oars – which were raised and faced backward or forward during rowing, somewhat similar to muscle attachments on the trochanter

The anatomical term trochanter (the bony protrusions on the femur) derives from the Greek τροχαντήρ (trochantḗr). This Greek word itself is generally broken down into:

- τροχάζω (trokházō), meaning "to run quickly", "to gallop", or "to move rapidly"
- -τήρ (-tḗr), a suffix in Greek that often signifies an agent or instrument ("one who [does something]" or "that which [does something]")

While the exact origin of the anatomical term trochanter is uncertain, multiple possible connections could be suggested. One possibility is that the term was derived directly from the Greek roots without influence from the maritime meaning, with the name referencing the trochanter's role in enabling swift movement through muscle attachment. Alternatively, the term may have been influenced by the Greek τροχαντήρ (trochantḗr), which referred to the protrusions on the stern of triremes that served as attachment points for ropes and sails. In a similar manner, the anatomical trochanters are prominent bony projections that serve as key attachment sites for muscles. Later usage came to include the femoral neck.

== Structure ==
In human anatomy, the trochanter is a part of the femur. It can refer to:

- Greater trochanter
- Lesser trochanter
- Third trochanter, which is occasionally present

== Other animals ==
- Fourth trochanter, of archosaur leg bones
- Trochanter (arthropod leg), a segment of the arthropod leg

== See also ==
- Intertrochanteric crest
- Intertrochanteric line
