= Lesser sciatic notch =

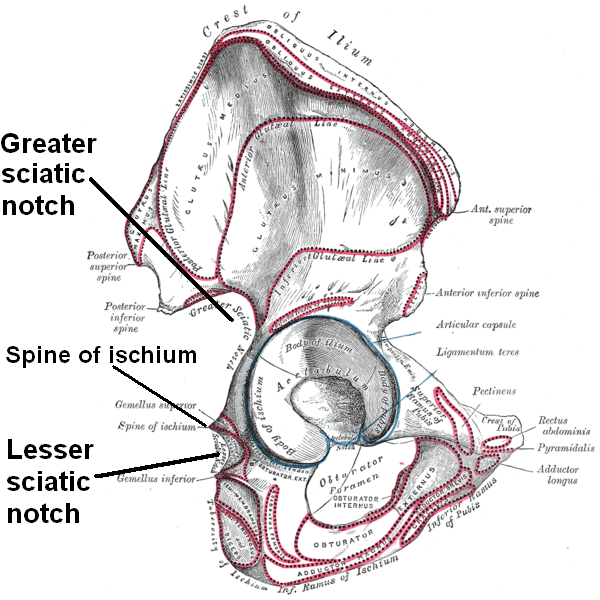
- Right hip bone, external surface, showing greater sciatic notch and lesser sciatic notch, separated by the spine of ischium.

- Course and branches of the pudendal nerve through the lesser sciatic notch

Details

Identifiers
- Latin: incisura ischiadica minor
- TA98: A02.5.01.206
- TA2: 1344
- FMA: 16911

Below the ischial spine is a small notch, the lesser sciatic notch; it is smooth, coated in the recent state with cartilage, the surface of which presents two or three ridges corresponding to the subdivisions of the tendon of the obturator internus, which winds over it.

It is converted into a foramen, the lesser sciatic foramen, by the sacrotuberous and sacrospinous ligaments, and transmits the tendon of the obturator internus, the nerve which supplies that muscle, and the internal pudendal vessels and pudendal nerve.

== See also ==
- Lesser sciatic foramen
- Greater sciatic notch
