= Sacrospinous ligament =

Ligament of the pelvis

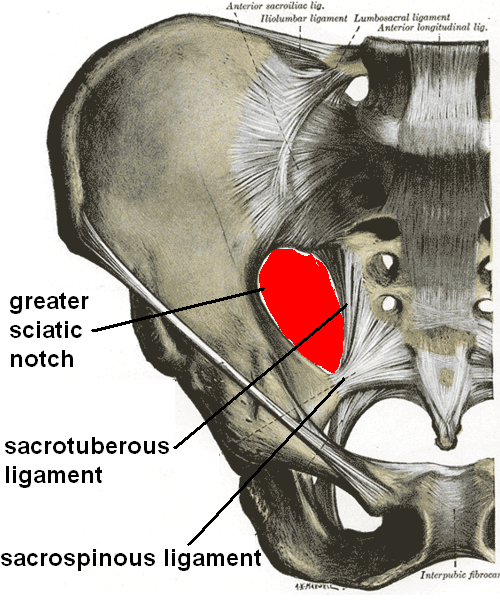
- Articulations of pelvis, anterior view, with greater sciatic foramen (labeled in red) and its boundaries.

Details
- From: Ischial spine
- To: Sacrum

Identifiers
- Latin: ligamentum sacrospinale
- TA98: A03.6.03.007
- TA2: 1852
- FMA: 21485

The sacrospinous ligament (small or anterior sacrosciatic ligament) is a thin, triangular ligament in the human pelvis. The base of the ligament is attached to the outer edge of the sacrum and coccyx, and the tip of the ligament attaches to the spine of the ischium, a bony protuberance on the human pelvis. Its fibres are intermingled with the sacrotuberous ligament.

== Structure ==
The sacrotuberous ligament passes behind the sacrospinous ligament. In its entire length, the sacrospinous ligament covers the equally triangular coccygeus muscle, to which its closely connected.

== Function ==
The presence of the ligament in the greater sciatic notch creates an opening (foramen), the greater sciatic foramen, and also converts the lesser sciatic notch into the lesser sciatic foramen. The greater sciatic foramen lies above the ligament, and the lesser sciatic foramen lies below it.

The pudendal vessels and nerve pass behind the sacrospinous ligament directly medially and inferiorly to the ischial spine. The inferior gluteal artery, from a branch of the internal iliac artery, pass behind the sciatic nerve and the sacrospinous ligament and is left uncovered in a small opening above the top of the sacrospinous ligament. The coccygeal branch of the inferior gluteal artery passes behind the mid-portion of the sacrospinous ligament and pierces the sacrotuberous ligament at multiple locations. The main body of the inferior gluteal artery leaves the pelvis posteriorly to the upper border of the sacrospinous ligament, to follow the inferior portion of the sciatic nerve out of the greater sciatic foramen.

The main function of the ligament is to prevent rotation of the ilium past the sacrum. Laxity of this ligament and the sacrotuberous ligament allows this rotation to occur. Stresses to these ligaments occur most often when leaning forward or getting out of a chair.

== Clinical significance ==
Vaginal prolapse or uterine prolapse may occur in women when other pelvic ligaments and supportive structures are weakened. One treatment is sacrospinous fixation. In this surgery, the apex of the vagina is sutured to the sacrospinous ligament, which may offer a sturdier support than weakened pelvic ligaments, ideally preventing further prolapse.

== Additional images ==
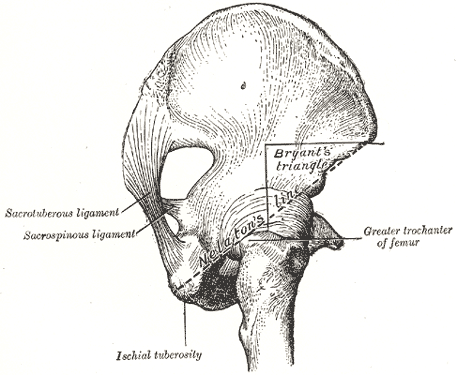
Nélaton's line and Bryant's triangle.

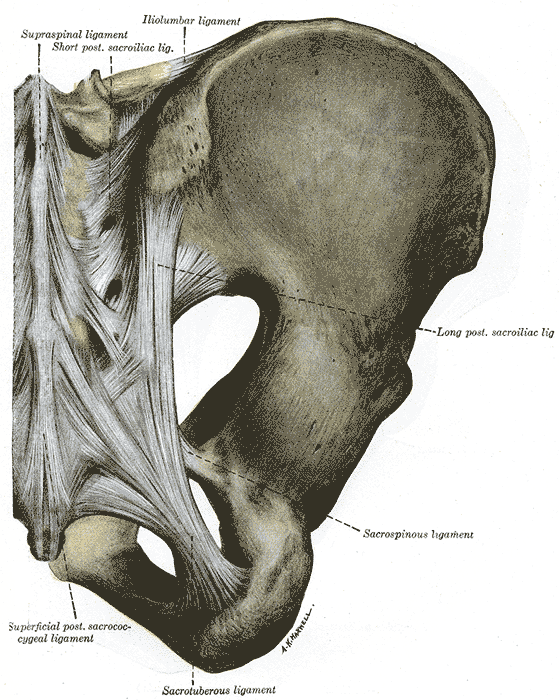
Articulations of pelvis. Posterior view.
