= Greater sciatic notch =

Notch in the hip bone

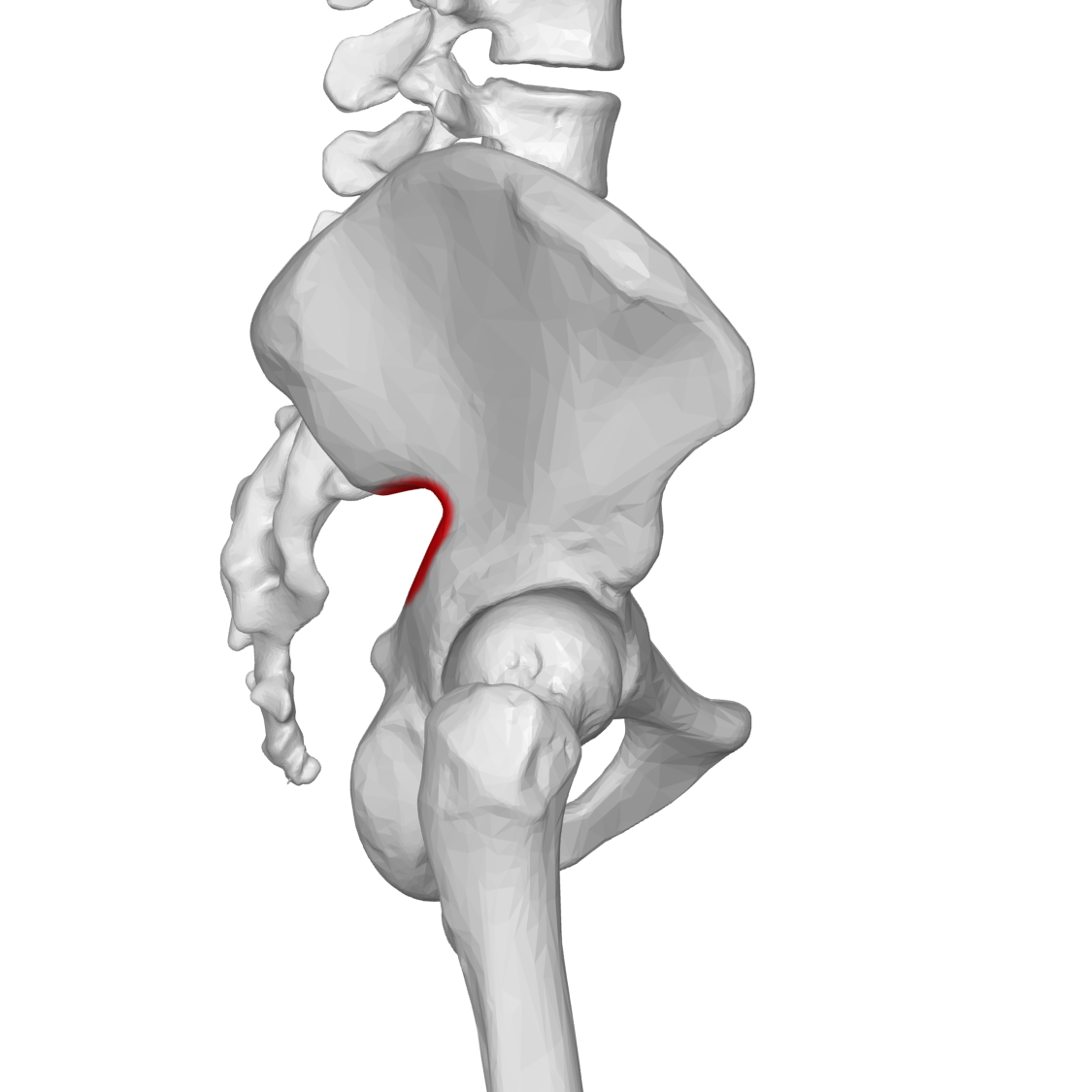
- Surface of the hip showing the greater sciatic notch in red

Details

Identifiers
- Latin: incisura ischiadica major
- TA98: A02.5.01.009
- TA2: 1315
- FMA: 16902

The greater sciatic notch is a notch in the ilium, one of the bones that make up the human pelvis. It lies between the posterior inferior iliac spine (above), and the ischial spine (below). The sacrospinous ligament changes this notch into an opening, the greater sciatic foramen.

The notch holds the piriformis, the superior gluteal vein and artery, and the superior gluteal nerve; the inferior gluteal vein and artery and the inferior gluteal nerve; the sciatic and posterior femoral cutaneous nerves; the internal pudendal artery and veins, and the nerves to the internal obturator and quadratus femoris muscles.

Of these, the superior gluteal vessels and nerve pass out above the piriformis, and the other structures below it.

The greater sciatic notch is wider in females (about 74.4 degrees on average) than in males (about 50.4 degrees).

== See also ==
- Greater sciatic foramen
- Lesser sciatic notch
