= Coxa vara =

Deformity of the hip

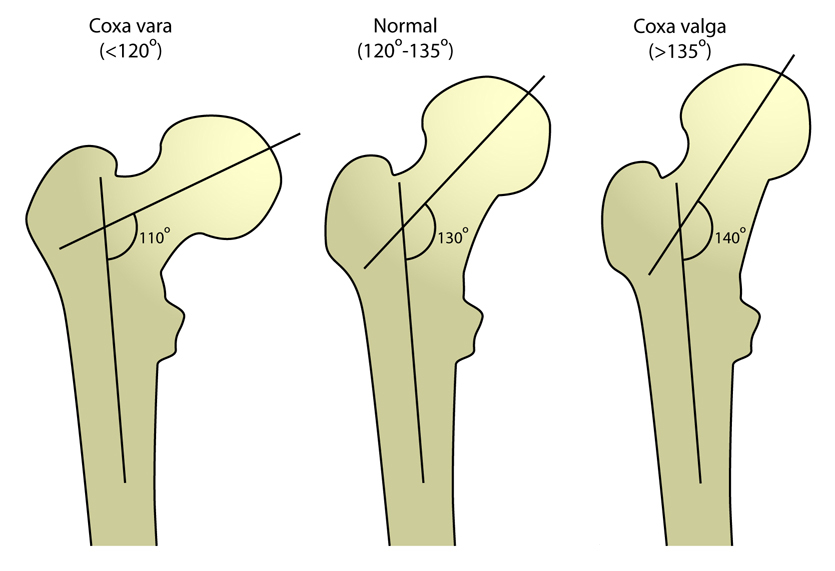
- Left to right: coxa vara, normal femur, coxa valga
- Specialty: Medical genetics

Coxa vara is a deformity of the hip, whereby the angle between the head and the shaft of the femur is reduced to less than 120 degrees. This results in the leg being shortened and the development of a limp. It may be congenital and is commonly caused by injury, such as a fracture. It can also occur when the bone tissue in the neck of the femur is softer than normal, causing it to bend under the weight of the body. This may either be congenital or the result of a bone disorder. The most common cause of coxa vara is either congenital or developmental. Other common causes include metabolic bone diseases (e.g. Paget's disease of bone), post-Perthes deformity, osteomyelitis, and post traumatic (due to improper healing of a fracture between the greater and lesser trochanter). Shepherd's Crook deformity is a severe form of coxa vara where the proximal femur is severely deformed with a reduction in the neck shaft angle beyond 90 degrees. It is most commonly a sequela of osteogenesis imperfecta, Paget's disease, osteomyelitis, tumour and tumour-like conditions (e.g. fibrous dysplasia).

Coxa vara can happen in cleidocranial dysostosis.

== Anatomy ==
In early skeletal development, a common physis serves the greater trochanter and the capital femoral epiphysis. This physis divides as growth continues in a balance that favors the capital epiphysis and creates a normal neck shaft angle (angle between the femoral shaft and the neck). The corresponding angle at maturity is 135 ± 7 degrees. Another angle used for the measurement of coxa vara is the cervicofemoral angle which is approximately 35 degrees at infancy and increases to 45 degrees after maturity.

== Types ==
=== Developmental ===
- primary defect in endochondral ossification of the medial part of the femoral neck (Most common cause)
- Excessive intrauterine pressure on the developing fetal hip
- vascular insult
- Faulty maturation of the cartilage and metaphyseal bone of the femoral neck

Clinical feature: presents after the child has started walking but before six years of age. Usually associated with a painless hip due to mild abductor weakness and mild limb length discrepancy.

If there is a bilateral involvement the child might have a waddling gait or trendelenburg gait with an increased lumbar lordosis. The greater trochanter is usually prominent on palpation and is more proximal. Restricted abduction and internal rotation.

X-ray: decreased neck shaft angle, increased cervicofemoral angle, vertical physis, shortened femoral neck decrease in femoral anteversion. HE angle (Hilgenriener epiphyseal angle- angle subtended between a horizontal line connecting the triradiate cartilage and the epiphysis); normal angle is <30 degrees.

Treatment: HE angle of 45–60 degrees: observation and periodic follow up.

Indication for surgery: HE angle more than 60 degrees, progressive deformity, neck-shaft angle <90 degrees, development of Trendelenburg gait

Surgery: subtrochanteric valgus osteotomy with adequate internal rotation of distal fragment to correct anteversion; common complication is recurrence. If HE angle is reduced to 38 degrees, less evidence of recurrence; post operative spica cast is used for a period of 6–8 weeks.

Coxa vara is also seen in Niemann–Pick disease.

=== Congenital ===
Presence at birth is extremely rare and associated with other congenital anomalies such as proximal femoral focal deficiency, fibular hemimelia or anomalies in other part of the body such as cleidocranial dyastosis. The femoral deformity is present in the subtrochanteric area where the bone is bent. The cortices are thickened and may be associated with overlying skin dimples. External rotation of the femur with valgus deformity of knee may be noted. This condition does not resolve and requires surgical management. Surgical management includes valgus osteotomy to improve hip biomechanics and length and rotational osteotomy to correct retroversion and lengthening.

== See also ==
- Coxa valga
- Genu valgus
