= Greater sciatic foramen =

Part of the pelvis

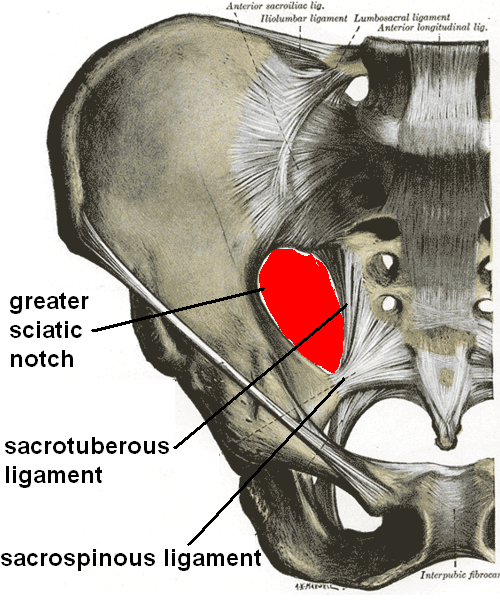
- The pelvis showing the greater sciatic foramen in red

Details

Identifiers
- Latin: foramen ischiadicum majus
- TA98: A03.6.03.008
- TA2: 1316
- FMA: 17031

The greater sciatic foramen is an opening (foramen) in the posterior human pelvis. It is formed by the sacrotuberous and sacrospinous ligaments. The piriformis muscle passes through the foramen and occupies most of its volume. The greater sciatic foramen is wider in women than in men.

== Structure ==
It is bounded as follows:

- anterolaterally by the greater sciatic notch of the ilium.
- posteromedially by the sacrotuberous ligament.
- inferiorly by the sacrospinous ligament and the ischial spine.
- superiorly by the anterior sacroiliac ligament.

== Function ==
The piriformis, which exits the pelvis through the foramen, occupies most of its volume.

The following structures also exit the pelvis through the greater sciatic foramen:

Location	Name	Vessels	Nerves
Above the Piriformis	suprapiriform foramen	superior gluteal vessels	superior gluteal nerve
Below the Piriformis	infrapiriform foramen	inferior gluteal vessels internal pudendal vessels	inferior gluteal nerve pudendal nerve sciatic nerve posterior femoral cutaneous nerve Nerve to obturator internus Nerve to quadratus femoris

== See also ==
- Lesser sciatic foramen
