= Third trochanter =

Common but unusual feature of the human femur

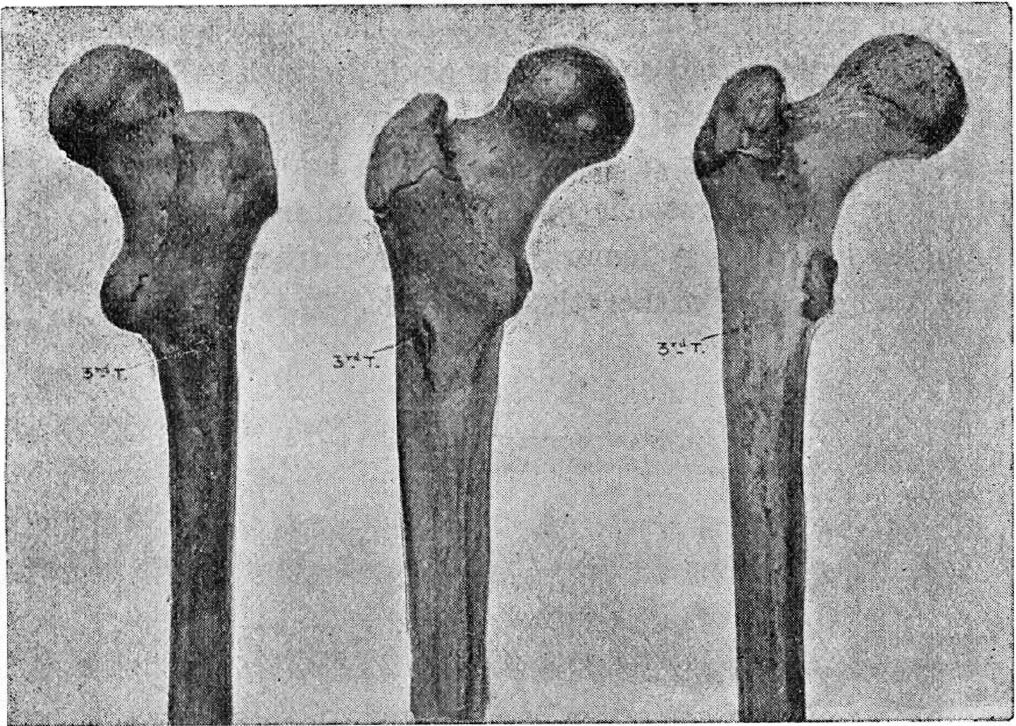
- Human femoral bones featuring third trochanters

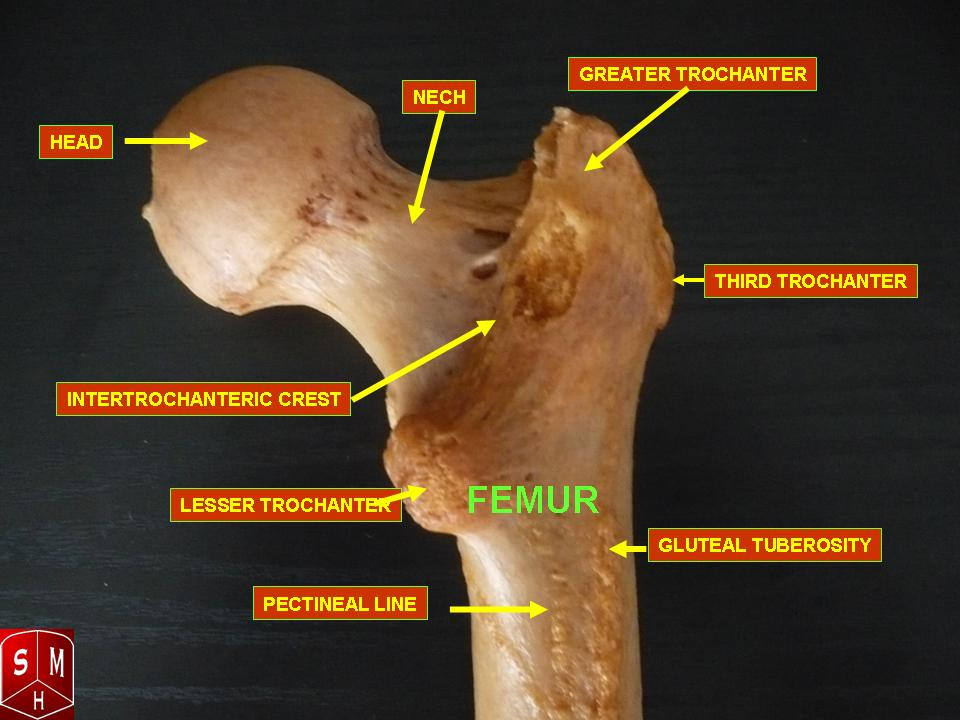
- Human right femur. Posterior view, featuring third trochanter

Details

Identifiers
- Latin: trochanter tertius
- TA98: A02.5.04.008
- TA2: 1367
- FMA: 75824

In human anatomy, the third trochanter is a bony projection occasionally present on the proximal femur near the superior border of the gluteal tuberosity. When present, it is oblong, rounded, or conical in shape and sometimes continuous with the gluteal ridge. It generally occurs bilaterally without significant side to side dimorphism. A structure of minor importance in humans, the incidence of the third trochanter varies from 17 to 72% between ethnic groups and it is frequently reported as more common in females than in males. Structures analogous to the third trochanter are present in other mammals, including some primates, but also in horses. It is called the third trochanter in reference to the greater and lesser trochanters that are always present on the femur.

== Function ==
Its function is to provide an attachment for the ascending tendon of the gluteus maximus muscle. It may function as (1) a reinforcement mechanism for the proximal femoral diaphysis in response to increased ground reaction force and (2) to increase the attachment surface area for the gluteal musculature and thereby providing greater efficiency of contracture. Mechanical load from the gluteus maximus may, on the other hand, affect the morphology of the proximal femur, similar to how quadriceps determines the size and shape of the tibial tuberosity, and thereby the shape of the third trochanter. However, no certain conclusions regarding the biomechanical role of the third trochanter can be made.

== Anthropology ==
The third trochanter is associated with short, robust femora, and is frequently present and well developed in Neanderthals (that were shorter and more robust than anatomically modern humans) but generally absent in higher primates.

Studying fossils of Ardipithecus ramidus (a chimpanzee–human last common ancestor candidate), Lovejoy et al. 2009 noted that in this species—as well as in Proconsul, Nacholapithecus, and Dryopithecus (Miocene primates)—homologs to the third trochanter and the hypotrochanteric fossa are present while both traits are absent in extant apes. They concluded that the hominid morphotype is primitive and the femoral shape of apes is derived contrary to what was previously thought.

== See also ==
- Fourth trochanter
