= Internal pudendal =

Internal pudendal may refer to:

- Internal pudendal artery
- Internal pudendal veins
