= Ischial bursitis =

- Specialty: Orthopaedics
- Symptoms: Inflammation, Pain
- Causes: Prolonged sitting on hard surfaces

Ischial bursitis (also known as weaver's bottom) is inflammation of the synovial bursa located between gluteus maximus muscle and ischial tuberosity.

== Signs and symptoms ==
Ischial bursitis causes pain down the posterior aspect of the upper thigh. There may be pain over the ischial tuberosity. Chronic ischial bursitis may cause paraesthesia. This pain may become immediately more severe when sitting down.

== Cause ==
Ischial bursitis is usually caused by prolonged sitting on a hard surface. It may also be related to ischial apophysitis, which may be caused by exercise, particularly in young and athletic patients.

== Mechanism ==
The ischial bursa is a synovial bursa located between gluteus maximus muscle and ischial tuberosity. When in a seated position, the ischial bursa is put under the highest amount of pressure, which is most significant against a hard surface.

Friction from exercise can lead to inflammation of the ischial bursa, known as bursitis.

== Diagnosis ==
Ischial bursitis is usually diagnosed clinically based on symptoms. An x-ray (using injected contrast agent) may be used to identify the formation of calluses.

== Treatment ==
Ischial bursitis is usually treated conservatively. Lifestyle changes may be advised, avoiding certain exercises and sitting on hard surfaces. Analgesics, such as nonsteroidal anti-inflammatory drugs, may be used to relieve pain.

Ischial bursitis may be treated with medical and surgical interventions if it is persistent or particularly severe. Analgesics, anaesthetics, or triamcinolone may be injected to relieve pain.

== Epidemiology ==
Ischial bursitis is a fairly rare illness. When a patient presents with symptoms, other conditions such as a spinal disc herniation may be considered.

== History ==
Ischial bursitis is also known as "weaver's bottom" and "tailor's bottom" after professions which involve prolonged sitting on a hard surface.
