= Quadrate line =

Ridge of the femur

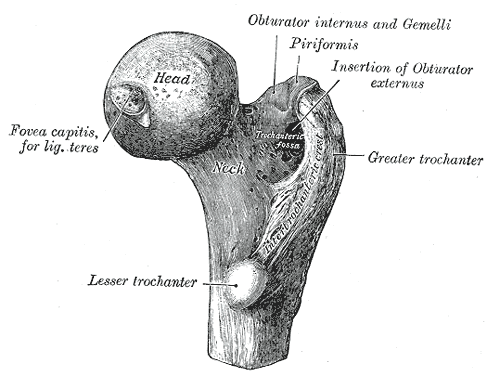
- Upper extremity of right femur viewed from behind and above.

Details

Identifiers
- Latin: linea quadrata

A slight ridge is sometimes seen commencing about the middle of the intertrochanteric crest, and reaching vertically downward for about 5 cm. along the back part of the body: it is called the linea quadrata (or quadrate line), and gives attachment to the Quadratus femoris and a few fibers of the Adductor magnus.
