= Quadrate tubercle =

Tubercle

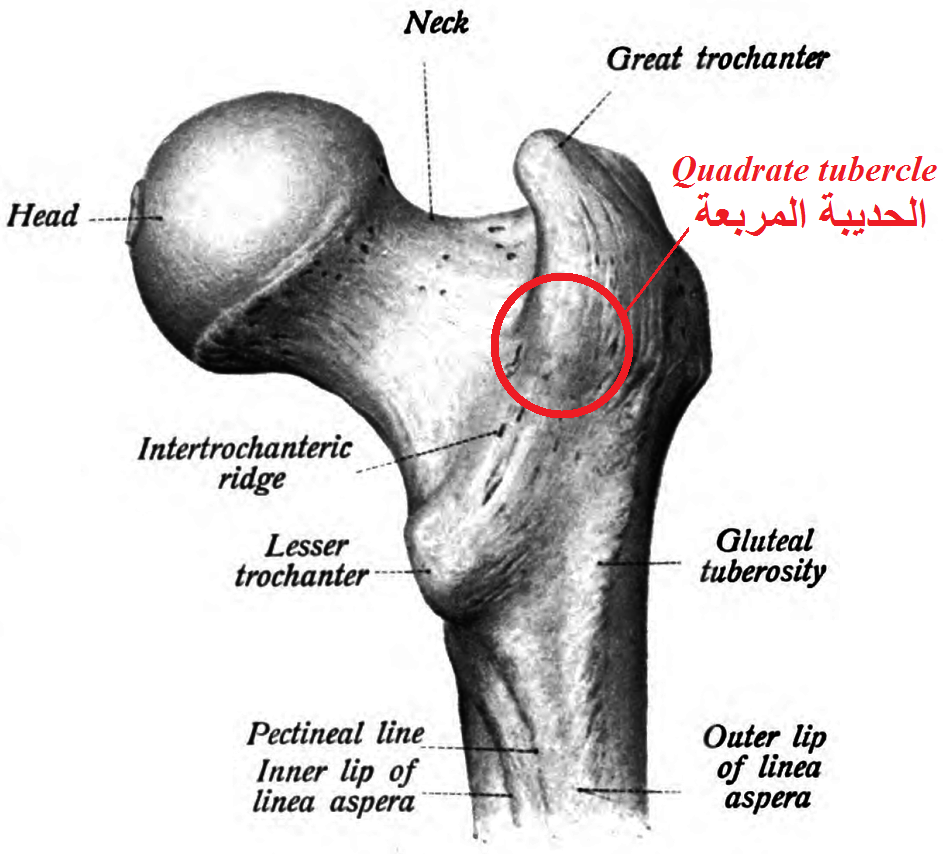
- Right femur. Posterior surface. (Quadratus femoris labeled.)

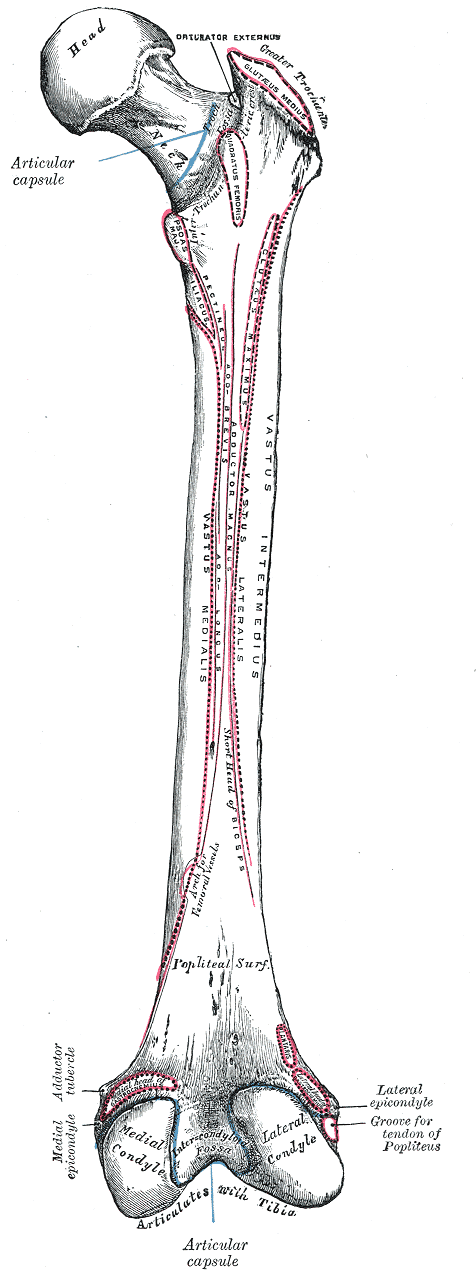
- Right femur. Posterior surface. (Quadratus femoris labeled at top center.)

Details

Identifiers
- Latin: tuberculum quadratum
- TA98: A02.5.04.011
- TA2: 1370
- FMA: 43709

The quadrate tubercle is a small tubercle found upon the upper part of the femur. It serves as a point of insertion of the quadratus femoris muscle, along with the intertrochanteric crest and the linea quadrata.

== Structure ==
The quadrate tubercle is located about the junction of the upper one-third and lower two-thirds, on the intertrochanteric crest. In a small anatomical study, it was shown that the epiphysial line passes directly through the quadrate tubercle. The quadrate tubercle is the site of insertion of the quadratus femoris muscle.

=== Variation ===
The size of the quadrate tubercle varies. It is not always located on the intertrochanteric crest. Adjacent areas can also be part of the quadrate tubercle, such as the posterior surface of the greater trochanter or the neck of the femur.

== Additional images ==
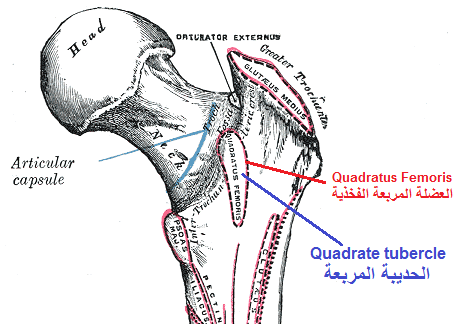
Right femur. Posterior surface. (Quadratus femoris and Quadrate tubercle labeled.)
