= Ischial tuberosity =

Bones used to sit

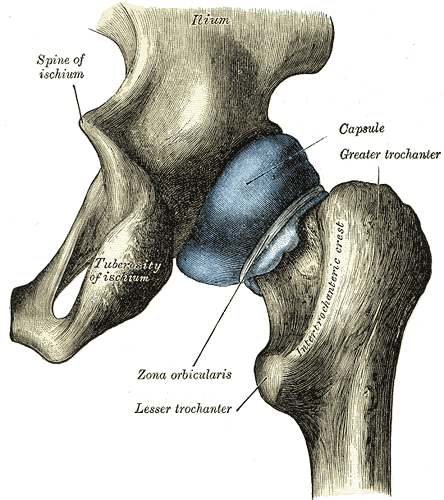
- Capsule of hip-joint (distended). Posterior aspect. (Ischial tuberosity visible at bottom left.)

Details

Identifiers
- Latin: tuber ischiadicum, tuberositas ischiadica
- TA98: A02.5.01.204
- TA2: 1342
- FMA: 17010

The ischial tuberosity (or tuberosity of the ischium, tuber ischiadicum), also known colloquially as the sit bones or sitz bones, or as a pair the sitting bones, is a large posterior bony protuberance on the superior ramus of the ischium. It marks the lateral boundary of the pelvic outlet.

When sitting, the weight is frequently placed upon the ischial tuberosity. The gluteus maximus provides cover in the upright posture, but leaves it free in the seated position. The distance between a cyclist's ischial tuberosities is one of the factors in the choice of a bicycle saddle.

== Divisions ==
The tuberosity is divided into two portions: a lower, rough, somewhat triangular part, and an upper, smooth, quadrilateral portion.

- The lower portion is subdivided by a prominent longitudinal ridge, passing from base to apex, into two parts:
  - The outer gives attachment to the adductor magnus
  - The inner to the sacrotuberous ligament
- The upper portion is subdivided into two areas by an oblique ridge, which runs downward and outward:
  - From the upper and outer area the semimembranosus arises
  - From the lower and inner, the long head of the biceps femoris and the semitendinosus

== Additional images ==
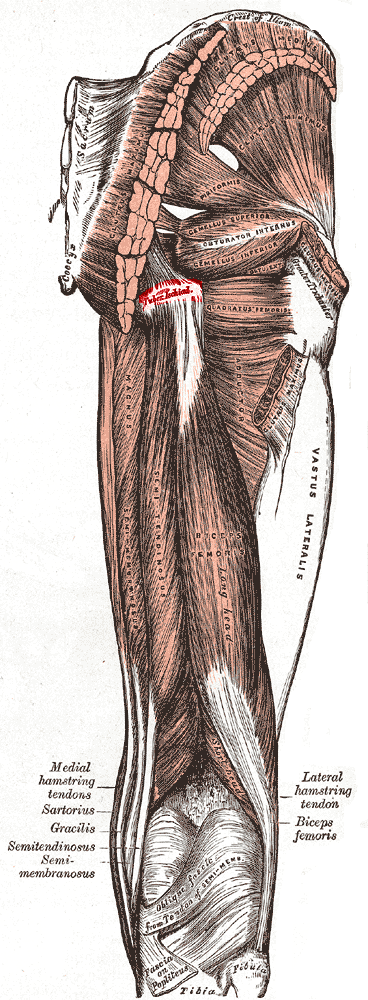
Muscles of the gluteal and posterior femoral regions, with ischial tuberosity highlighted in red

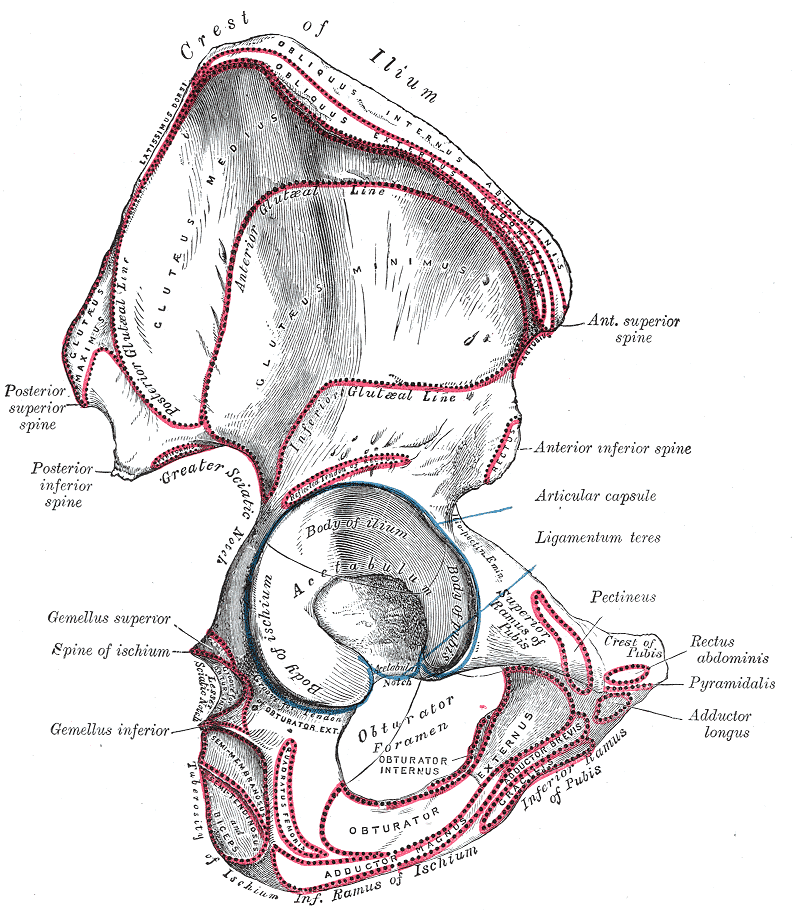
Right hip bone. External surface.

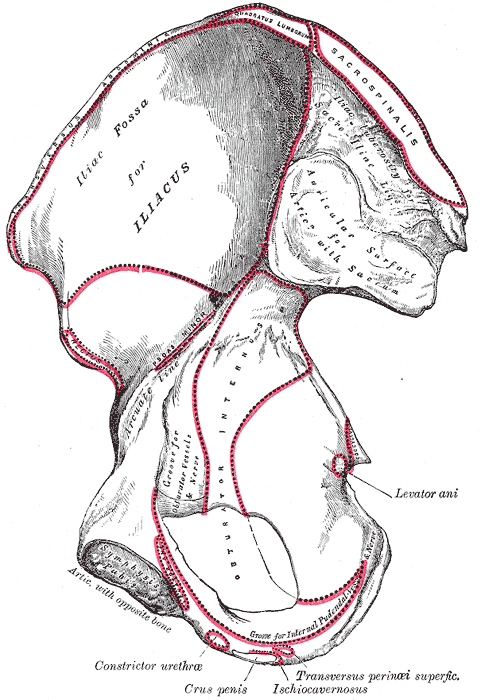
Right hip bone. Internal surface.

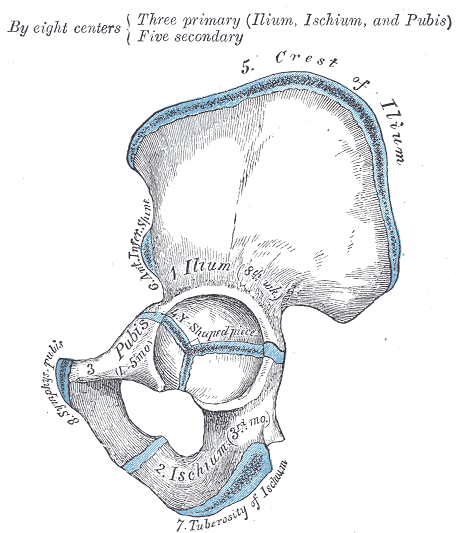
Plan of ossification of the hip bone

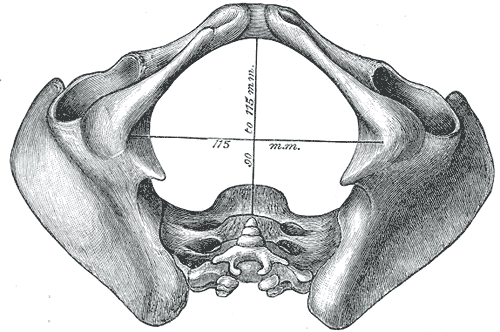
Diameters of inferior aperture of lesser pelvis (female)

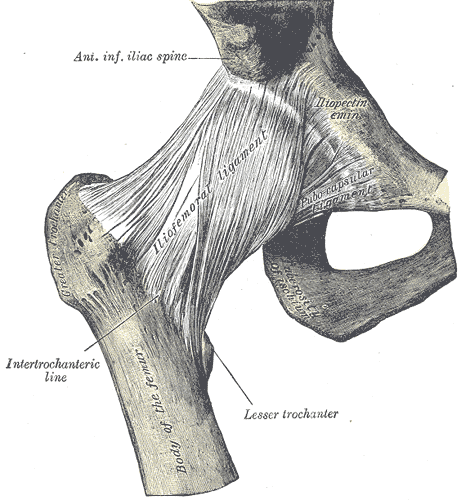
Right hip-joint from the front

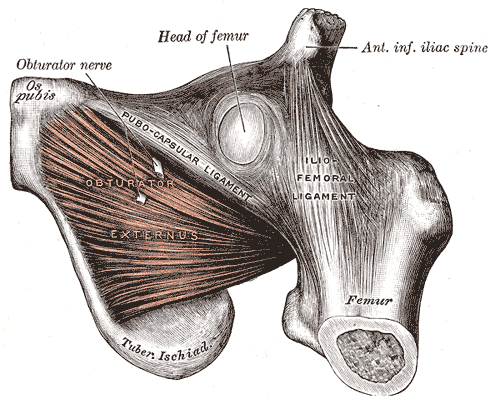
The obturator externus

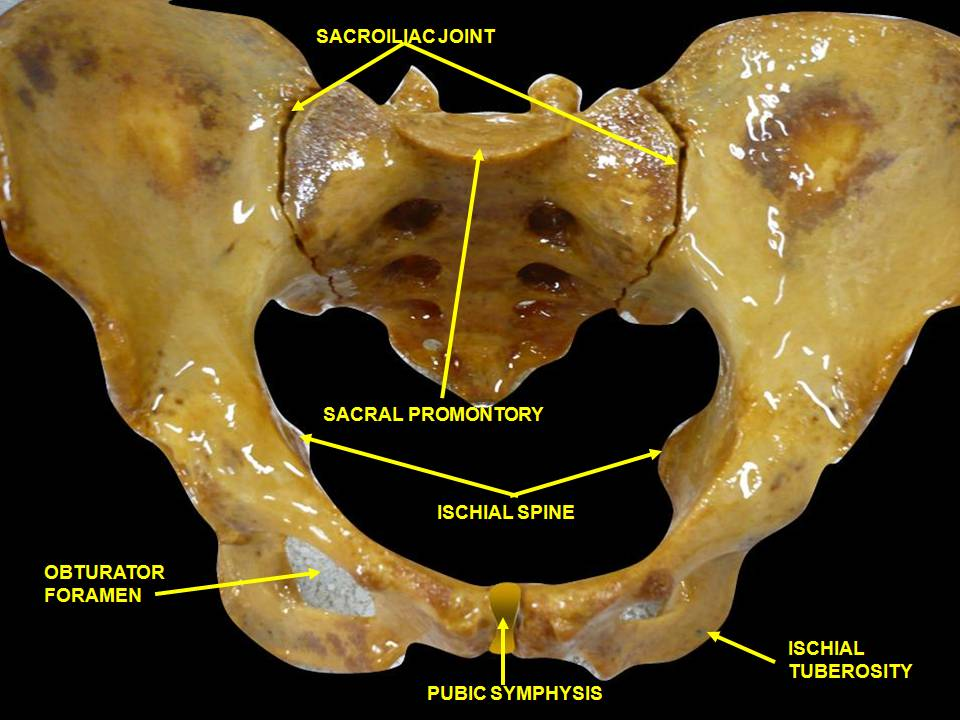
Anterior view of the pelvis with the ischial tuberosity labelled in the lower part of the image

== See also ==
- Ischial bursitis
- Sitting disability
