= Coxa valga =

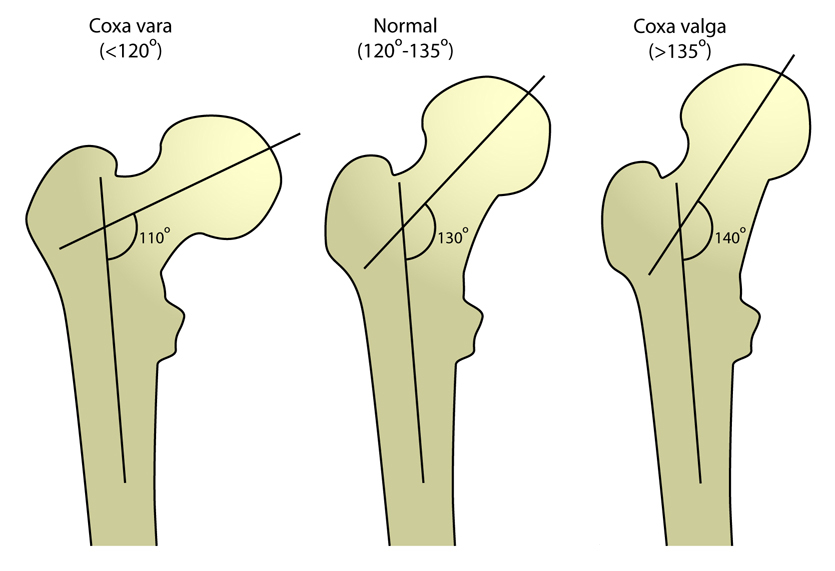
- Left to right: coxa vara, normal femur, coxa valga
- Specialty: Medical genetics

Coxa valga is a deformity of the hip where the angle formed between the head and neck of the femur and its shaft is increased, usually above 135 degrees.

The deformity may develop in children with neuromuscular disorders (i.e. cerebral palsy, spinal dysraphism, poliomyelitis), skeletal dysplasias, and juvenile idiopathic arthritis.

Coxa valga deformity is a common pathologic condition in children with cerebral palsy, and they may be predisposed to hip subluxation or dislocations.

== See also ==
- Coxa vara
- Genu valgum
- Genu varum
