= Lesser trochanter =

Conical projection from the shaft of the femur

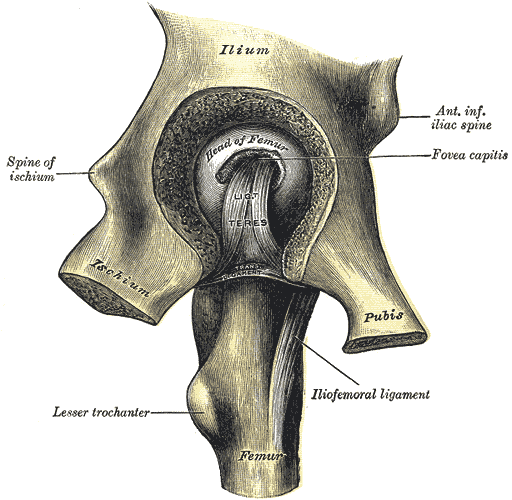
- Left hip-joint, opened by removing the floor of the acetabulum from within the pelvis.

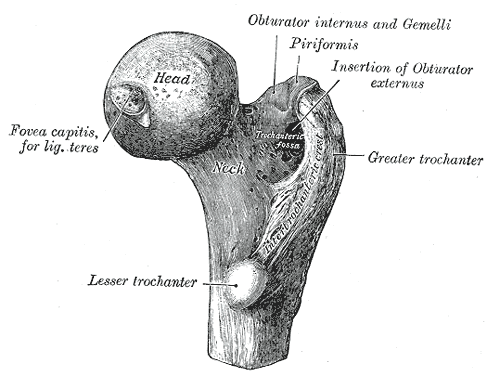
- Upper extremity of right femur viewed from behind and above.

Details
- Insertions: Psoas major, iliacus

Identifiers
- Latin: trochanter minor
- TA98: A02.5.04.007
- TA2: 1366
- FMA: 32853

In human anatomy, the lesser trochanter is a conical, posteromedial, bony projection from the shaft of the femur. It serves as the principal insertion site of the iliopsoas muscle.

== Structure ==
The lesser trochanter is a conical posteromedial projection of the shaft of the femur, projecting from the posteroinferior aspect of its junction with the femoral neck.

The summit and anterior surface of the lesser trochanter are rough, whereas its posterior surface is smooth.

From its apex three well-marked borders extend:

- two of these are above
  - a medial continuous with the lower border of the femur neck
  - a lateral with the intertrochanteric crest
- the inferior border is continuous with the middle division of the linea aspera

=== Attachments ===
The summit of the lesser trochanter gives insertion to the tendon of the psoas major muscle and the iliacus muscle; the lesser trochanter represents the principal attachment of the iliopsoas.

=== Anatomical relations ===
The intertrochanteric crest (which demarcates the junction of the femoral shaft and neck posteriorly) extends between the lesser trochanter and the greater trochanter on the posterior surface of the femur.

== Clinical significance ==
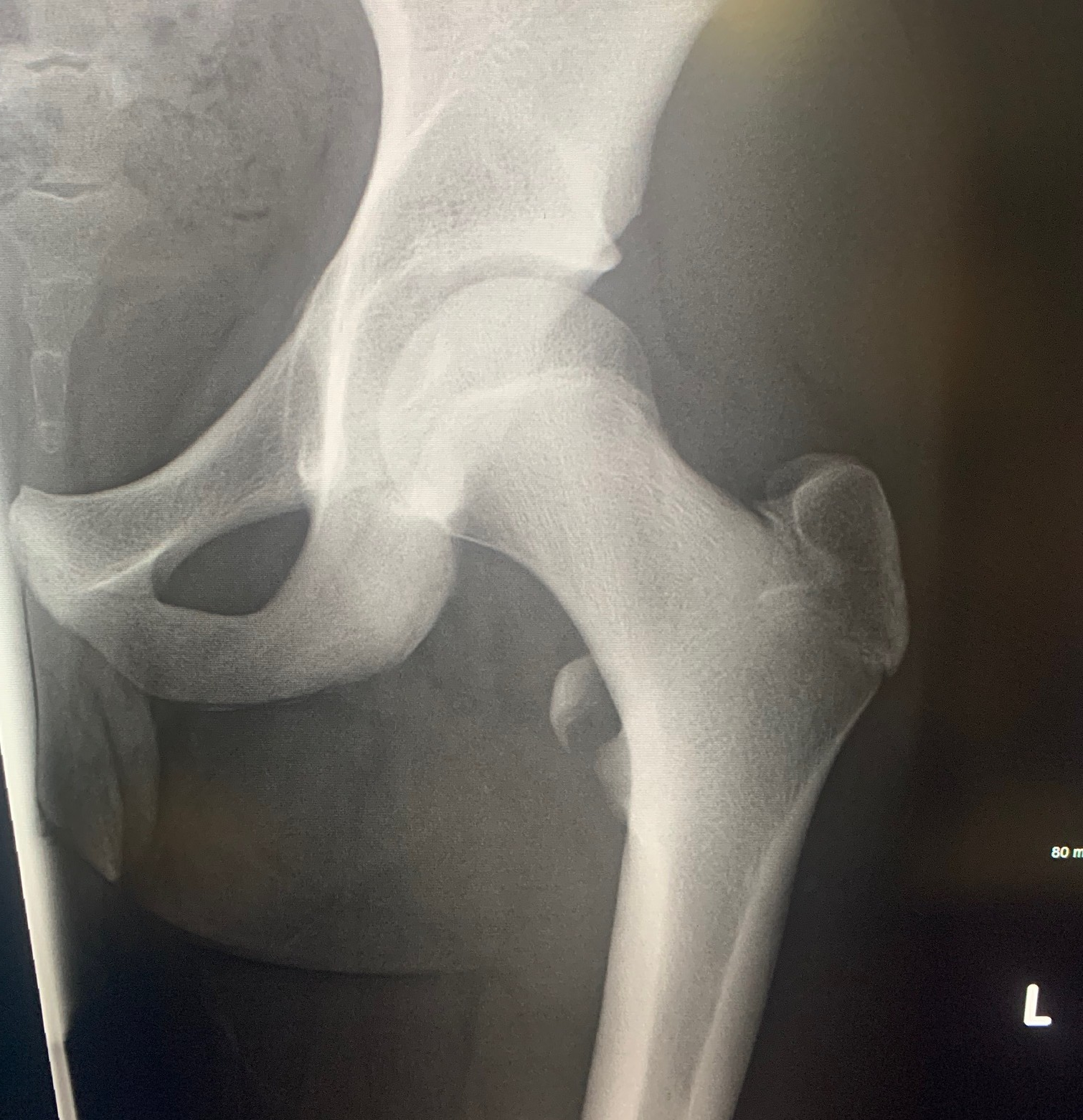
Lesser trochanter avulsion fracture

The lesser trochanter can be involved in an avulsion fracture.

== Other animals ==
=== Paleontology ===
The position of the lesser trochanter close to the head of the femur is one of the defining characteristics of the Prozostrodontia, which is the clade of cynodonts including mammals and their closest non-mammaliform relatives. It was erected as a node-based taxon as the least inclusive clade containing Prozostrodon brasiliensis, Tritylodon langaevus, Pachygenelus monus, and Mus musculus (the house mouse).

All living mammals have a lesser trochanter, whose size, shape, and position is distinctive to their species.

== Additional images ==
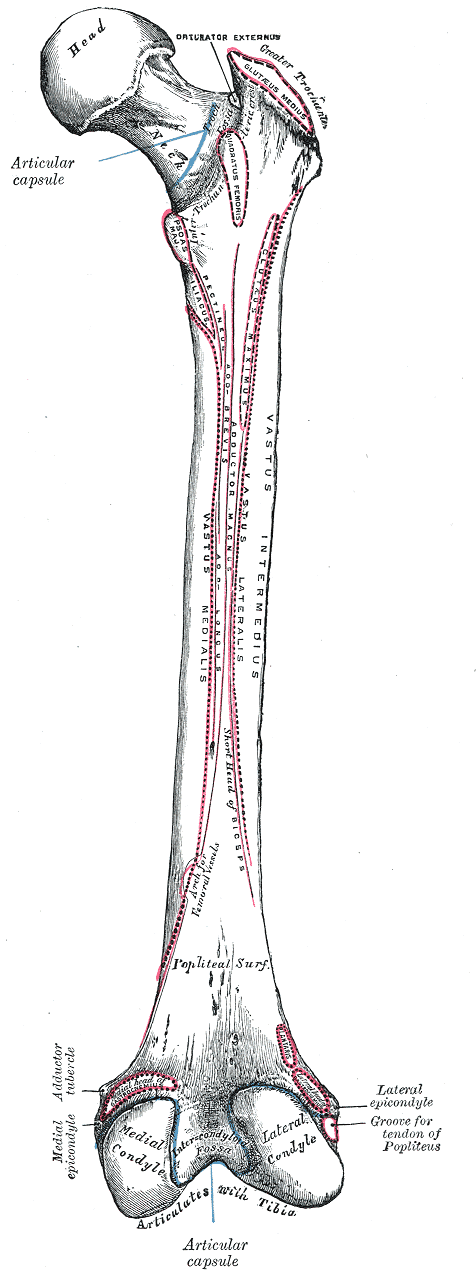
Right femur. Posterior surface.

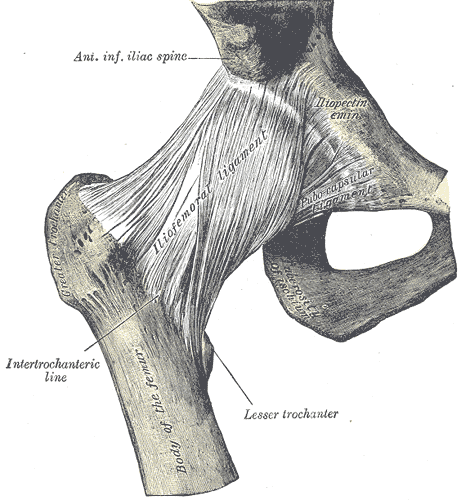
Right hip-joint from the front.

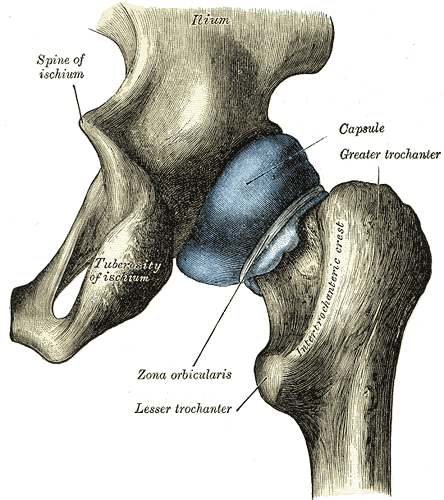
Capsule of hip-joint (distended). Posterior aspect.

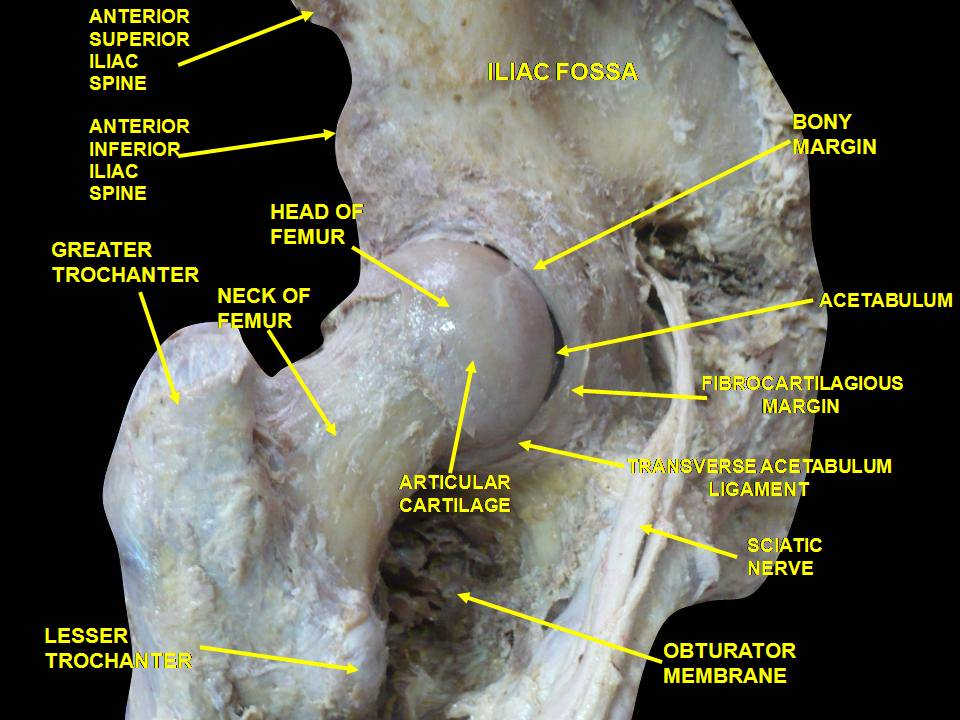
Hip joint. Lateral view. Lesser trochanter

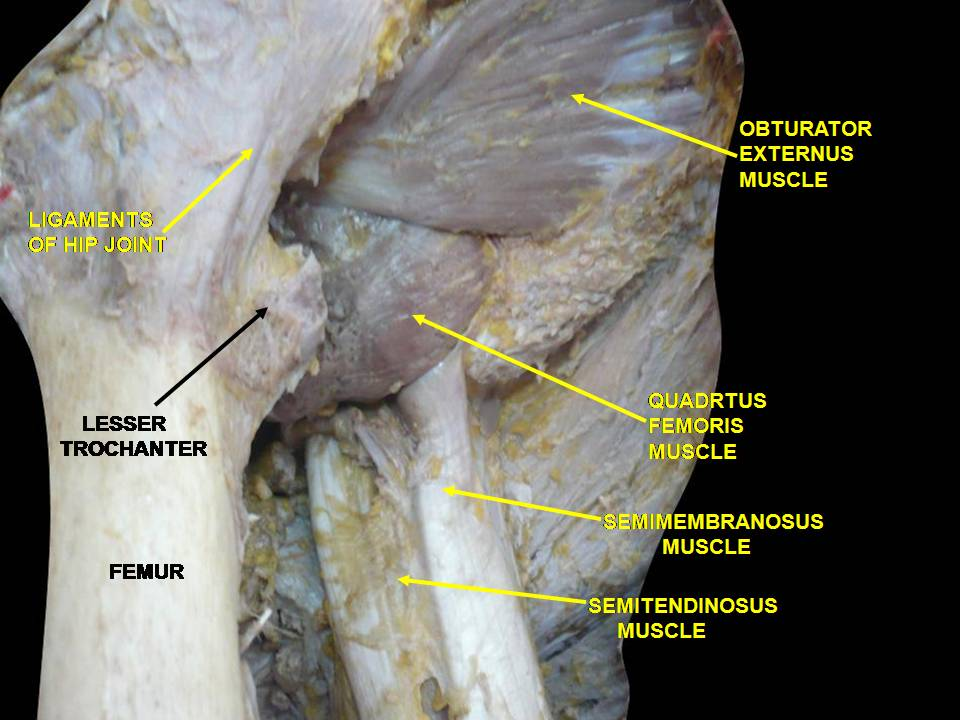
Muscles of thigh. Anterior views.

== See also ==
- Greater trochanter
- Third trochanter
