= Intertrochanteric crest =

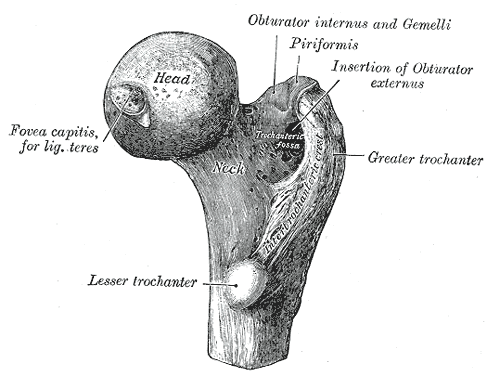
- Upper extremity of right femur viewed from behind and above. (Intertrochanteric crest labeled at right.)

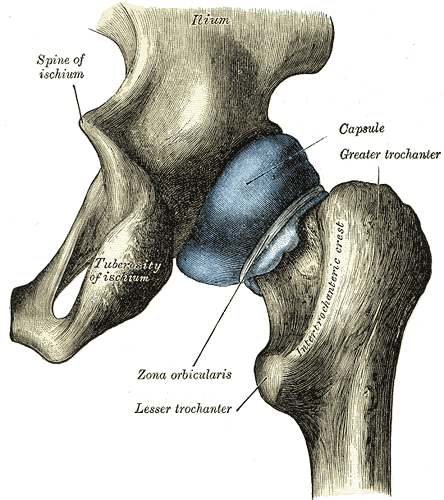
- Capsule of hip-joint (distended). Posterior aspect. (Intertrochanteric crest labeled at bottom right.)

Details

Identifiers
- Latin: crista intertrochanterica
- TA98: A02.5.04.010
- TA2: 1369
- FMA: 75100

The intertrochanteric crest is a prominent bony ridge upon the posterior surface of the femur at the junction of the neck and the shaft of the femur. It extends between the greater trochanter superiorly, and the lesser trochanter inferiorly.

== Anatomy ==
The intertrochanteric crest is a prominent smooth bony ridge upon the posterior surface of the femur at the junction of the neck and the shaft of the femur; together with the intertrochanteric line on the anterior side of the head, the intertrochanteric crest marks the transition between the femoral neck and shaft.

The intertrochanteric crest extends between the greater trochanter superiorly, and the lesser trochanter inferiorly; it passes obliquely inferomedially from the greater trochanter to the lesser trochanter.

An elevation between the middle and proximal third of the crest is known as the quadrate tubercle.

=== Relations ===
The distal capsular attachment on the femur follows the shape of the irregular rim between the head and the neck. As a consequence, the capsule of the hip joint attaches in the region of the intertrochanteric line on the anterior side, but a finger away from the intertrochanteric crest on the posterior side of the head.
