= Ischial spine =

Part of the posterior border of the body of the ischium bone of the pelvis

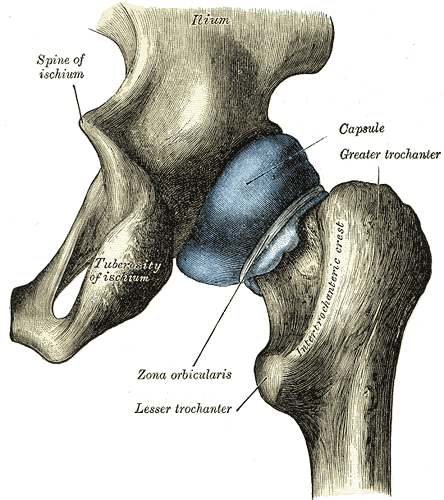
- Capsule of hip-joint (distended). Posterior aspect. (Spine of ischium labeled at upper left.)

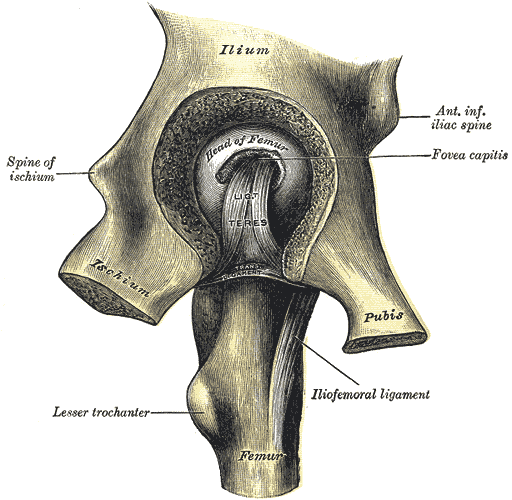
- Left hip-joint, opened by removing the floor of the acetabulum from within the pelvis. (Spine of ischium labeled at center left.)

Details

Identifiers
- Latin: spina ischiadica spina ischiaca spina ischialis
- TA98: A02.5.01.205
- TA2: 1343
- FMA: 17028

The ischial spine is part of the posterior border of the body of the ischium bone of the pelvis. It is a thin and pointed triangular eminence, more or less elongated in different subjects.

== Structure ==
Part	Attachment
external surface	gemellus superior muscle
internal surface	coccygeus muscle, levator ani muscle, pelvic fascia
pointed extremity	sacrospinous ligament

The pudendal nerve travels close to the ischial spine.

== Clinical significance ==
The ischial spine can serve as a landmark in pudendal anesthesia, as the pudendal nerve lies close to the ischial spine.

== Additional images ==
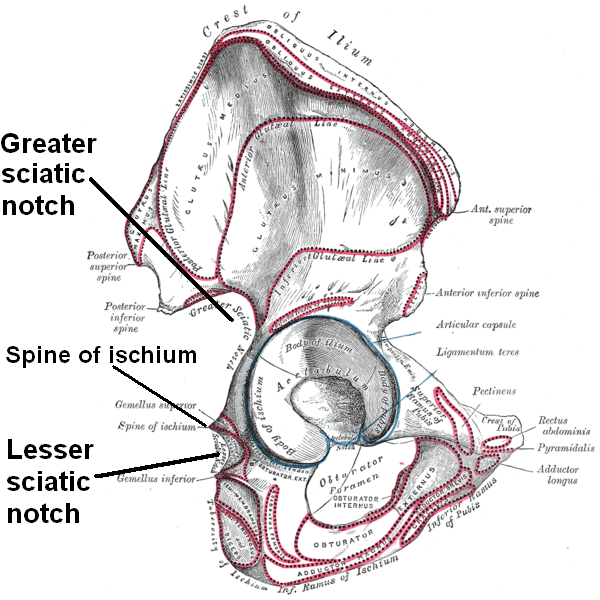
Right hip bone, external surface, showing the greater and lesser sciatic notches, separated by the ischial spine

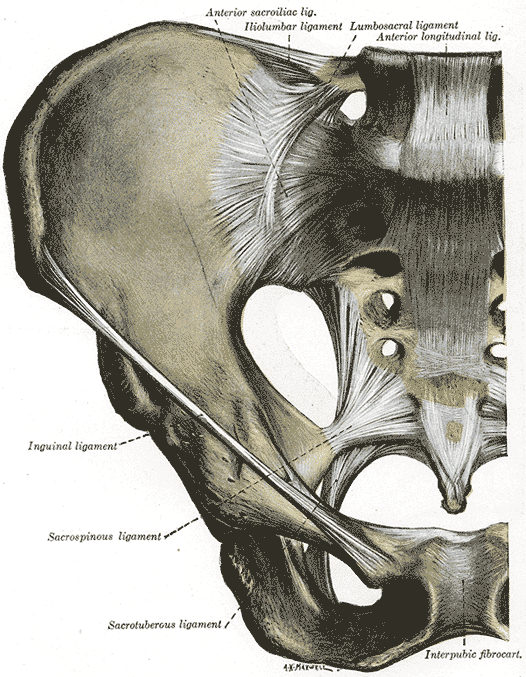
Articulations of pelvis. Anterior view.

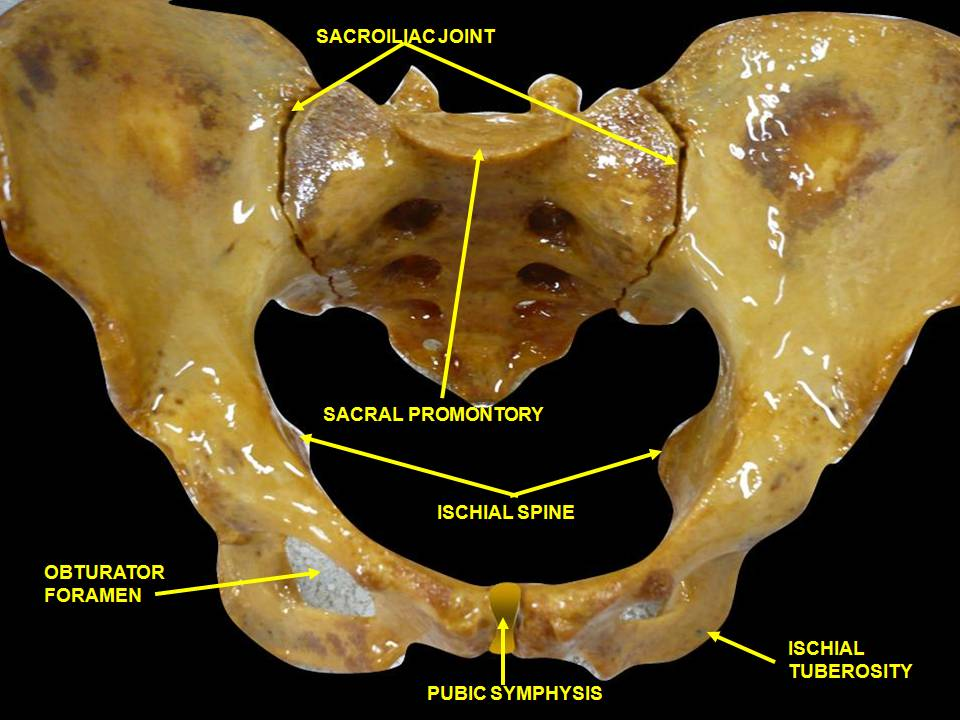
Pelvis. Anterior view.

Animation showing the ischial spine (highlighted in red)
