= Charles Servizio =

Push-up world record holder

- Born: September 5, 1950 (age 75); Lynn, Massachusetts, U.S.
- Known for: Setting the record for the most push-ups done in 24 hours
- Spouse: Maryanne (m. 1973)
- Children: 2

Charles Servizio (born September 5, 1950) is an American retired teacher known for setting the world record for the most push-ups done in 24 hours. On April 25, 1993, Servizio accomplished 46,001 push-ups in a span of 24 hours.

Servizio's high-school wrestling coach assigned push-ups as punishment for poor performance in tournaments. He was 38 when he made his first attempt to break the Guinness Book of World Records 24-hour push-up record. The attempt was unsuccessful – he quit at 30,000 push-ups and fell short of the standing record by over 4,000 push-ups. This was the first of four attempts in which he broke the existing records, the last being 46,001 push-ups in just over 22 hours.

== See also ==
- Doug Pruden
- George Kotsimpos
