= Push-up =

Calisthenics exercise

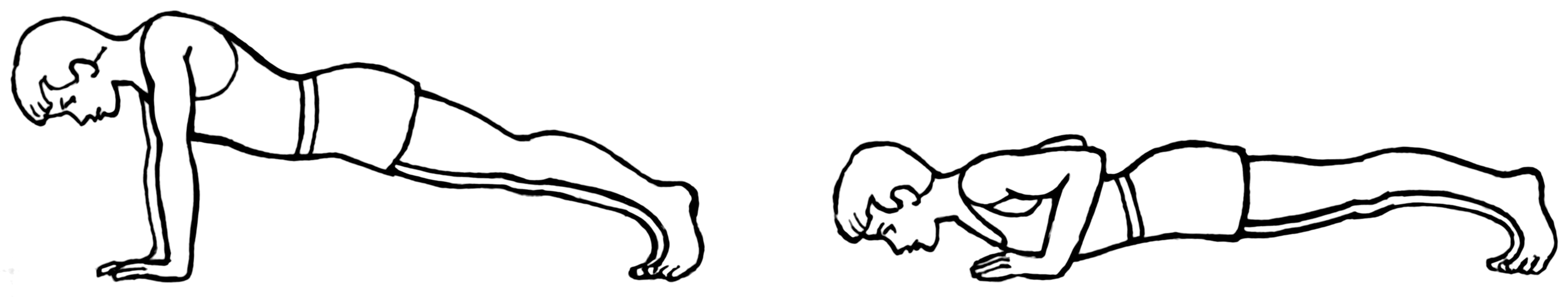
Side view of a push-up

The push-up (press-up in British English) is a calisthenics exercise beginning from the prone position. By raising and lowering the body using the arms while using the legs as support, push-ups exercise the pectoral muscles, triceps, and anterior deltoids, with ancillary benefits to the rest of the deltoids, serratus anterior, coracobrachialis, and the midsection as a whole. Push-ups are a basic exercise used in civilian athletic training or physical education and commonly in military physical training.

== Etymology ==
The American English term push-up was first used between 1905 and 1910, while the British press-up was first recorded in 1920.

== Body mass supported during push-ups ==
According to a study published in The Journal of Strength and Conditioning Research, test subjects supported with their hands, on average, 69.16% of their body mass in the up position, and 75.04% in the down position during the traditional push-ups. In modified push-ups, where knees are used as the pivot point, subjects supported 53.56% and 61.80% of their body mass in up and down positions, respectively.

== Muscles worked ==
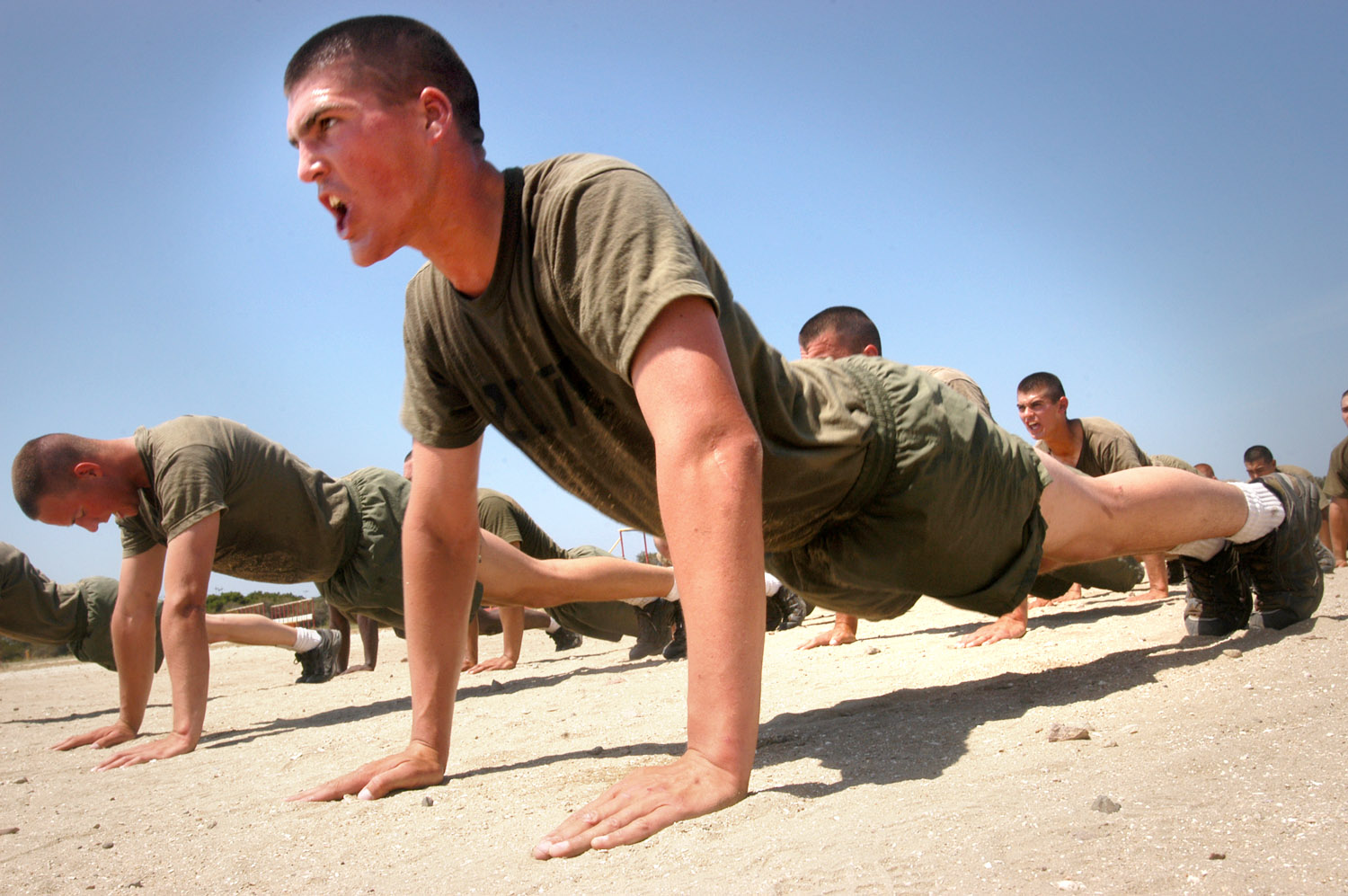
Military recruits will often perform push-ups as part of their physical training. Here, U.S. Marine recruits at Marine Corps Recruit Depot San Diego perform push-ups in May 2005, as a part of their basic recruit training.

The primary muscle groups targeted by push-ups include chest, front and medial deltoids, as well as triceps and forearm muscles. While the push-up primarily targets the muscles of the chest, arms, and shoulders, support required from other muscles results in a wider range of muscles integrated into the exercise.

=== Abdominals ===
The rectus abdominis and transversus abdominis contract continually while performing push-ups to hold the body off the floor and keep the legs and torso aligned. The rectus abdominis spans the front of the abdomen and is the most prominent of the abdominal muscles. The transversus abdominis lies deep within the abdomen, wrapping around the entire abdominal area. Both muscles compress the abdomen, and the rectus abdominis also flexes the spine forward, although it does not execute this function when performing push-ups.

=== Deltoid ===
The anterior portion of the deltoid muscle is one of the major shoulder-joint horizontal adductors, moving the upper arms toward the chest during the upward phase of a push-up. It also helps control the speed of movement during the downward phase. The deltoid attaches to parts of the clavicle and scapula, just above the shoulder joint on one end, and to the outside of the humerus bone on the other. Along with horizontal adduction, the anterior deltoid assists with flexion and internal rotation of the humerus within the shoulder socket.

=== Chest muscles ===
The push-up requires the work of many muscle groups, with one of the primary muscle groups being the chest muscles, the pectoralis major and the minor. These are the two large chest muscles and the main pushing muscle group of the upper body. When pushing and lowering the body during a push-up, the pectoralis major is doing most of the work.

=== Triceps brachii ===
While the anterior deltoids and pectoralis major muscles work to horizontally adduct the upper arms during the upward phase of a push-up, the triceps brachii muscles, or triceps for short, are also hard at work extending the elbow joints so the arms can be fully extended. The triceps also control the speed of elbow-joint flexion during the downward phase of the exercise. The closer together the hands are placed during a push-up, the harder the triceps work. The muscle is divided into three heads: the lateral, long, and medial heads. The lateral and medial heads attach to the back of the humerus bone, and the long head attaches just behind the shoulder socket on one end; all three heads combine and attach to the back of the elbow on the other.

=== Joints and tendons ===
Inner muscles that support the operation of the fingers, wrists, forearms, and elbows are also worked isometrically. Some push-up modifications that require to have the arms at different heights effectively engage the rotator cuff.

== Variations ==
=== Knee push-ups ===
"Modified" or "knee" push-ups are performed by supporting the lower body on the knees instead of the toes, which reduces the difficulty. These are sometimes used in fitness tests for women, corresponding to regular push-ups for men. This is useful for warm-ups/downs, pyramids/drop sets, endurance training, and rehab. It can also be used to train in a more explosive plyometric manner (like clapping push-ups) when one cannot perform them with the feet. It can also be used with the one-arm variations as a transition. However, the intense pressure on the knees can be harmful.

=== Planche push-ups ===
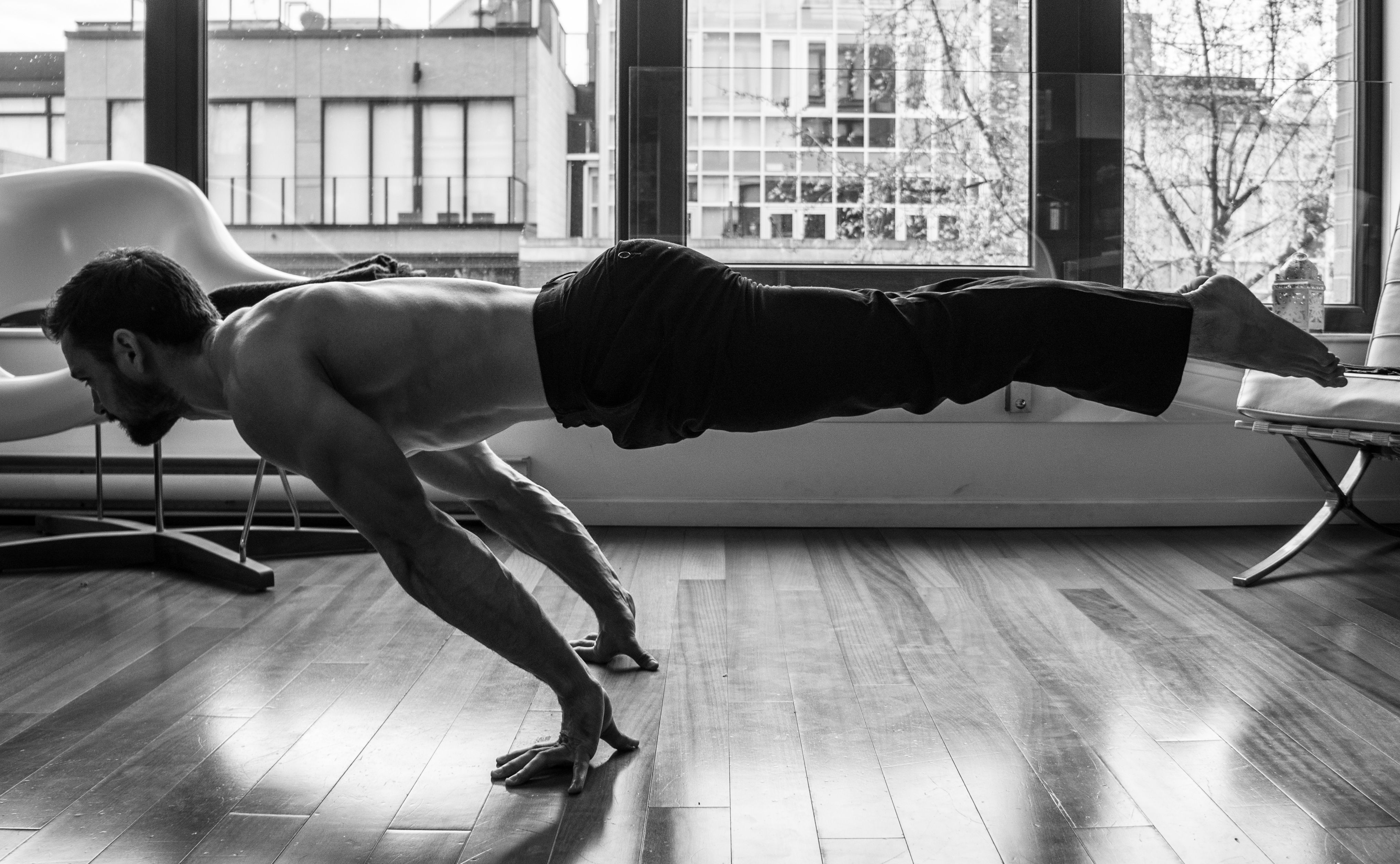
Planche position

An extremely difficult variation is to perform a push-up using only hands, without resting the feet on the floor, i.e., starting from and returning to the planche position. These are known as "planche push-ups". To do this variation, the body's center of gravity must be kept over the hands while performing the push-up by leaning forward while the legs are elevated in the air, which requires great strength and a high level of balance. The entire body weight is lifted in this variation.

=== Tandem push-ups ===
Tandem push-up performed by Guinness World Record duo Kotsimpos-Dervas

Tandem push-ups are a variation of traditional push-ups, performed by two people working together. Each person is facing a different direction but with one of the athletes lying faced downwards on top of the other. It is considered a very challenging variation of the regular push-up because it requires two people to co-ordinate with perfect balance placing their feet to each other's shoulders and pressing up.

=== Tandem knuckle push-ups ===
Tandem knuckle push-ups are a more challenging variation of push-ups performed by two people together, using their knuckles instead of their palms. They offer a greater challenge compared to tandem push-ups.

=== Hand release push-ups ===
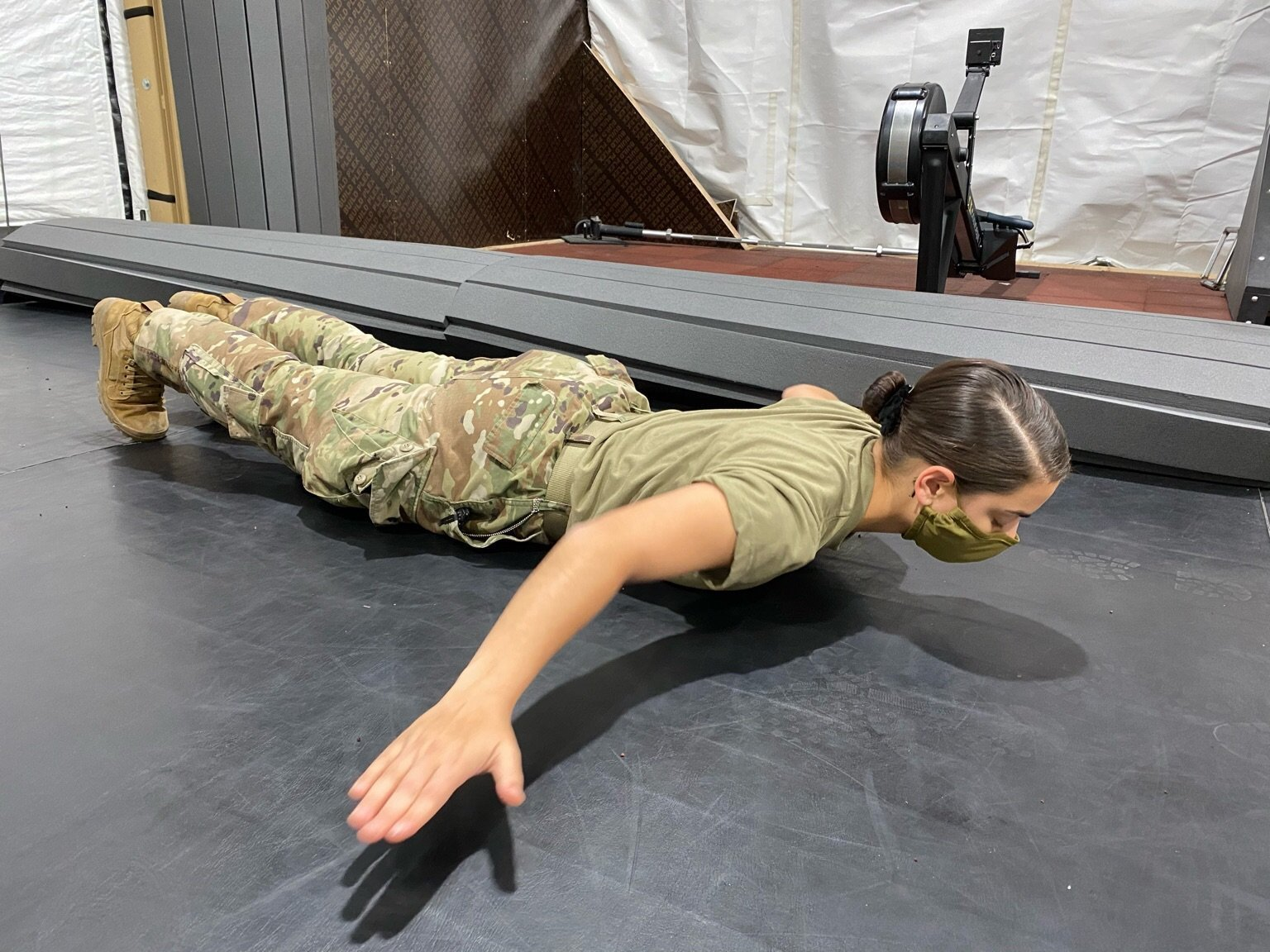
Hand release push-up.

Hand release push-ups are a much more challenging variation of traditional push-ups, involving lifting the hands off the floor between each repetition. This way the athlete is forced to do a full and complete repetition. Lifting the hands off the ground completely resets the movement eliminating the momentum. This variation builds core and shoulder strength in addition to the benefits of the regular push-up.

=== Push-ups on medicine balls ===
Push-ups on medicine balls are a variation of push-ups that involve performing the exercise on top of three medicine balls instead of on the floor. This modification adds an element of instability and greater core engagement to the exercise, making it more challenging and effective for building upper body strength and stability.More difficult variations include push-ups on medicine balls with one leg raised, decline push-ups on medicine balls and decline push-ups on medicine balls with one leg raised.

=== Hindu push-up ===
The Hindu push-up, also known as a dand. This is the most basic version, similar to that used by Bruce Lee who referred to it as a cat stretch.

The most basic form of Hindu push-up starts from the downward dog yoga position (hands and feet on the floor with the posterior raised) and transitions to a cobra position (hands and feet on the floor with the torso arched forwards and the legs close to the floor). It is also known as a dand, and is still widely known by this title, especially in India where it originated. It is a common exercise in Indian physical culture and martial arts, particularly Pehlwani. Bruce Lee also used it in his training regime and referred to it as a cat stretch, influenced by The Great Gama. It is an effective core strength exercise because it dynamically involves both the anterior and posterior chains. There are numerous variations of the Hindu push-up although most incorporate the two postures used in the most basic version. It may also be known as a Hanuman push up, judo push up, or dive-bomber push-up.

=== Backhanded push-up ===
The backhanded push-up is a form of push-ups performed using the back of the hands, rather than the palms. Currently, the record holder of the backhanded push-ups is Bill Kathan who broke the world record in 2010, by performing 2,396 on Valentine's Day.

=== One-arm versions ===
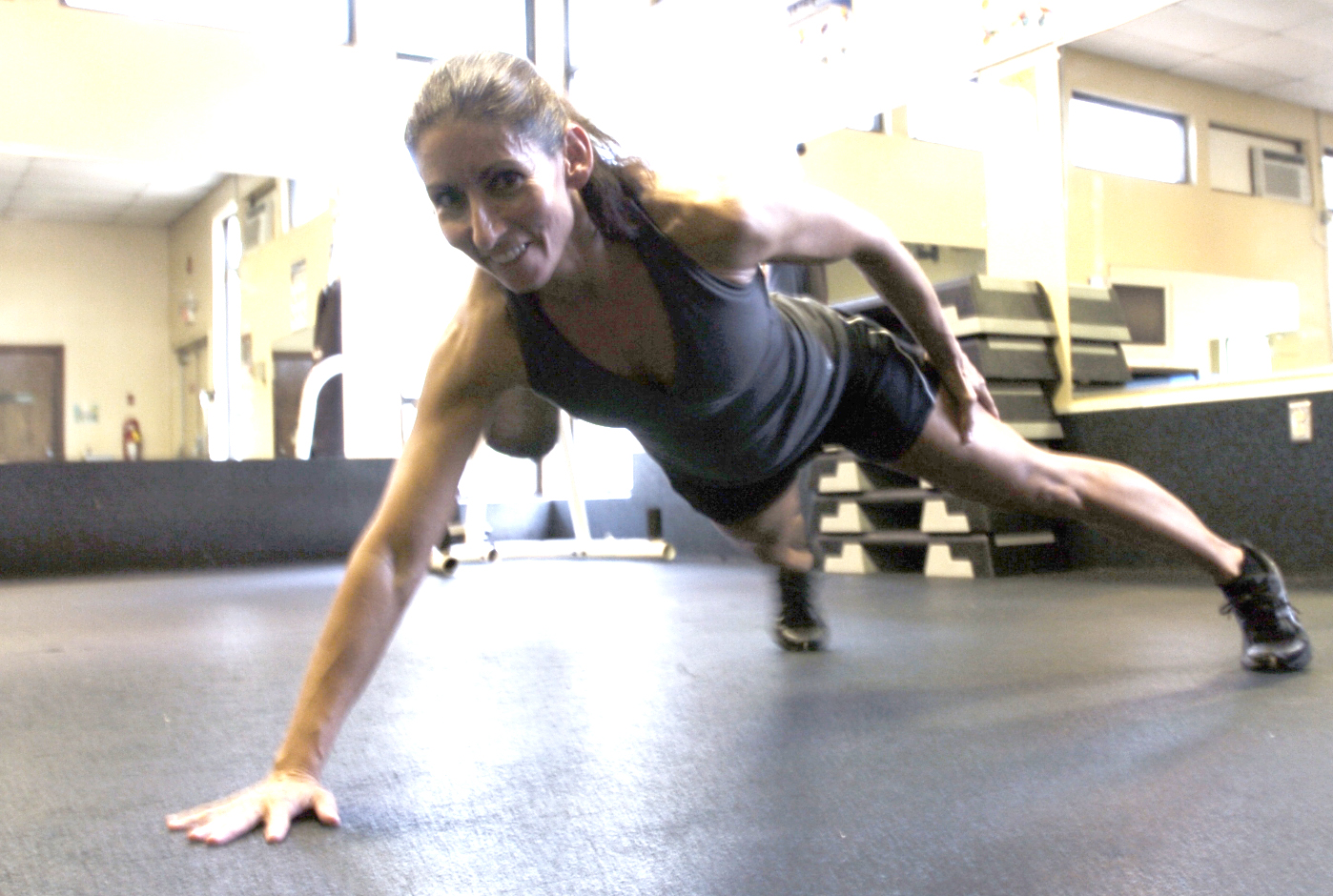
A U.S. Army servicemember demonstrates a one-arm push-up in an extended position.

Many of the push-up variations can be done using one arm instead of two. This will further increase the resistance put upon the trainee.

== Record breakers and attempts ==
- The Guinness world record for most push-ups in one hour by a man is 3,378 by Pop Laurentiu on 30 June 2023 in London, UK.
- The Guinness world record for most push-ups in one hour by a woman is 1,575 by DonnaJean Wilde on 28 September 2024.
- The most push-ups in 24 hours is 46,001 and was achieved by Charles Servizio on 25 April 1993.

== In the animal kingdom ==
There are zoology observations that certain animals emulate a push up action. Most notably various taxa of the fence lizard exhibit this display, primarily involving the male engaging in postures to attract females. The western fence lizard is a particular species that engages in this behavior. It may be noted that in Mexican Spanish, push-ups are called "Lagartijas", which means "lizards".

== See also ==
- Pull-up (exercise)
- Dip (exercise)
- Bench press
- Calisthenics
- Handstand pushup
- Jumping jack
- Plank (exercise)
- Sit-up (exercise)
- World Push Up Championships
