= Gluteus maximus =

Largest and most superficial of the three gluteal muscles

- The location of the gluteus maximus

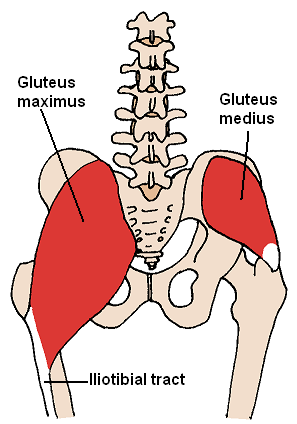
- The gluteus maximus and gluteus medius

Details
- Origin: Gluteal surface of ilium, lumbar fascia, sacrum, sacrotuberous ligament
- Insertion: Gluteal tuberosity of the femur and iliotibial tract
- Artery: Superior and inferior gluteal arteries
- Nerve: Inferior gluteal nerve (L5, S1 and S2 nerve roots)
- Actions: External rotation and extension of the hip joint, supports the extended knee through the iliotibial tract, chief antigravity muscle in sitting and abduction of the hip
- Antagonist: Iliacus, psoas major and psoas minor

Identifiers
- Latin: musculus glutaeus maximus
- TA98: A04.7.02.006
- TA2: 2598
- FMA: 22314

The gluteus maximus is the main extensor muscle of the hip in humans. It is the largest and outermost of the three gluteal muscles and makes up a large part of the shape and appearance of each side of the hips. It is the single largest muscle in the human body. Its thick fleshy mass, in a quadrilateral shape, forms the prominence of the buttocks. The other gluteal muscles are the medius and minimus, and sometimes informally these are collectively referred to as the glutes.

Its large size is one of the most characteristic features of the muscular system in humans, connected as it is with the power of maintaining the trunk in the erect posture. Other primates have much flatter hips and cannot sustain standing erectly.

The muscle is made up of muscle fascicles lying parallel with one another, and are collected together into larger bundles separated by fibrous septa.

== Structure ==
The gluteus maximus (or buttock) is the outermost muscle of the buttocks. It arises from connections to nearby structures in this area. It arises from the posterior gluteal line of the outer upper ilium, a bone of the pelvis, as well as above it to the iliac crest and slightly below it; from the lower part of the sacrum and the side of the coccyx, the tailbone; from the aponeurosis of the erector spinae (lumbodorsal fascia), the sacrotuberous ligament, and the fascia covering the gluteus medius (gluteal aponeurosis).

The fibers are directed obliquely inferiorly and laterally;

The gluteus maximus ends in two main areas:

- those forming the upper and larger portion of the muscle, together with the superficial fibers of the lower portion, end in a thick tendinous lamina, which passes across the greater trochanter, and inserts into the iliotibial band of the fascia lata;
- the deeper fibers of the lower portion are inserted into the gluteal tuberosity of the linea aspera, between the vastus lateralis and adductor magnus. If present, the third trochanter also serves as an attachment.
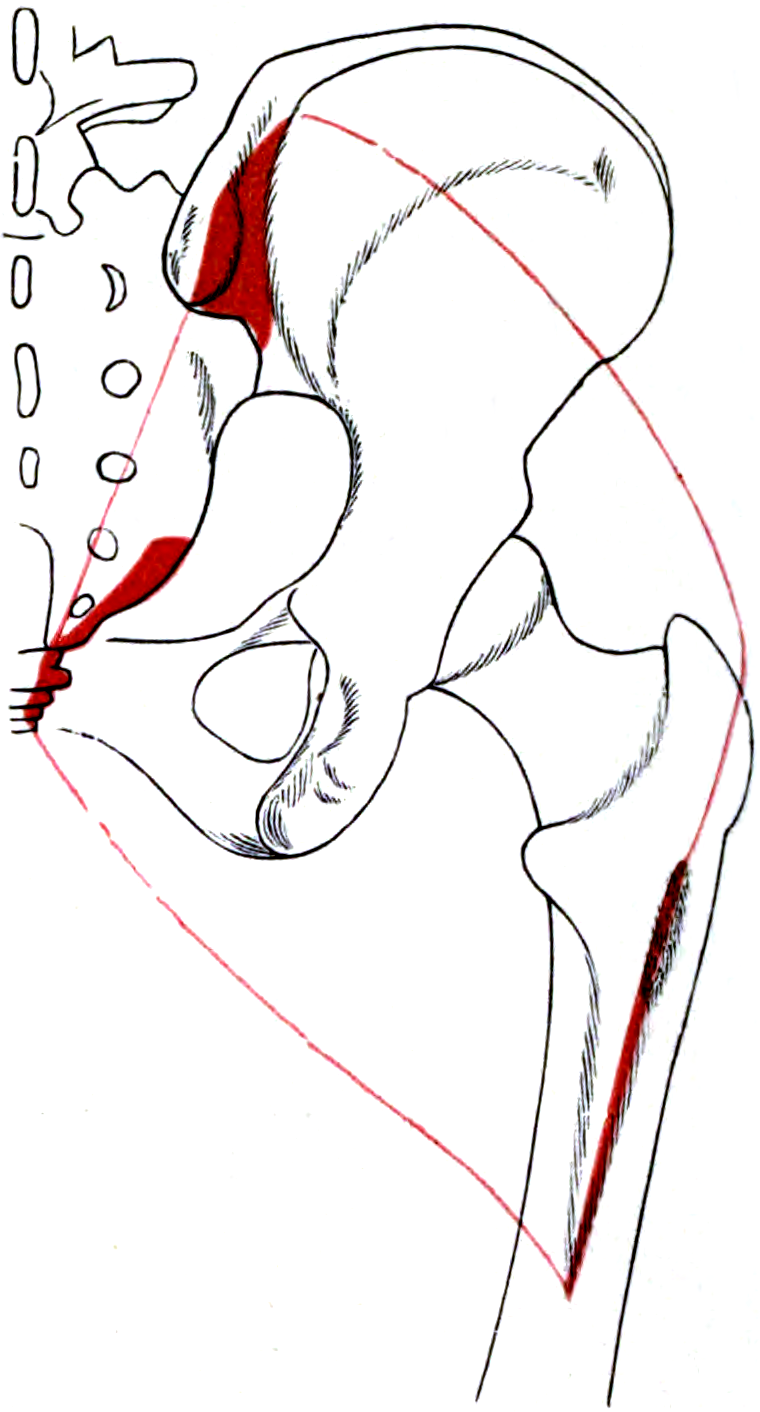
Gluteus maximus of right side: outline and attachment-areas.

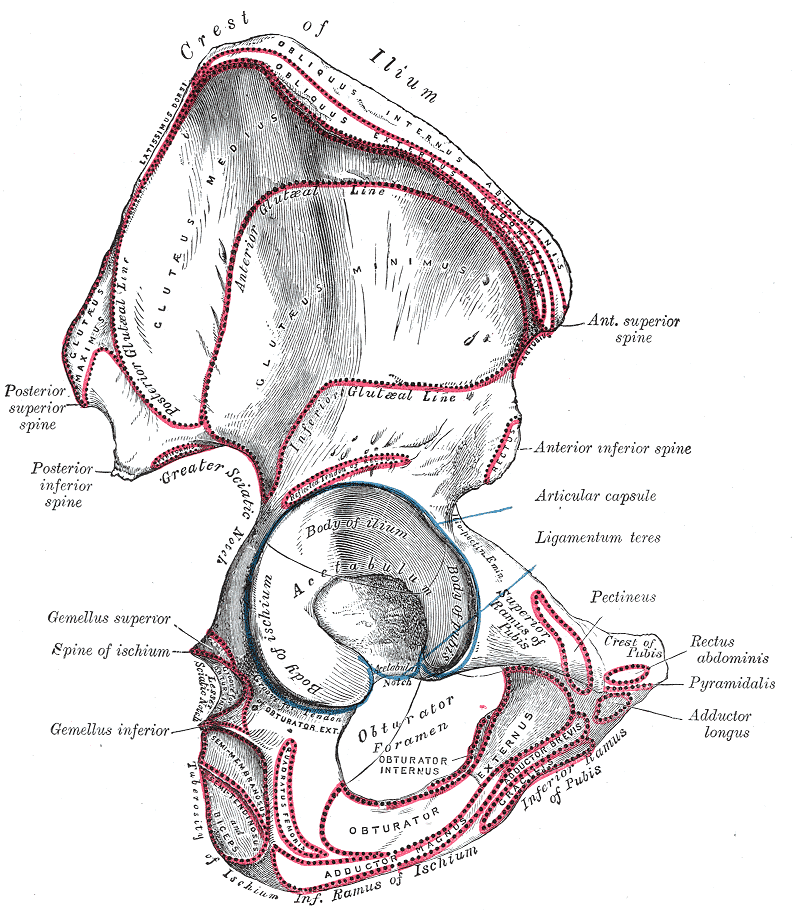
Image showing the outer surface of the ilium, showing the inferior gluteal line

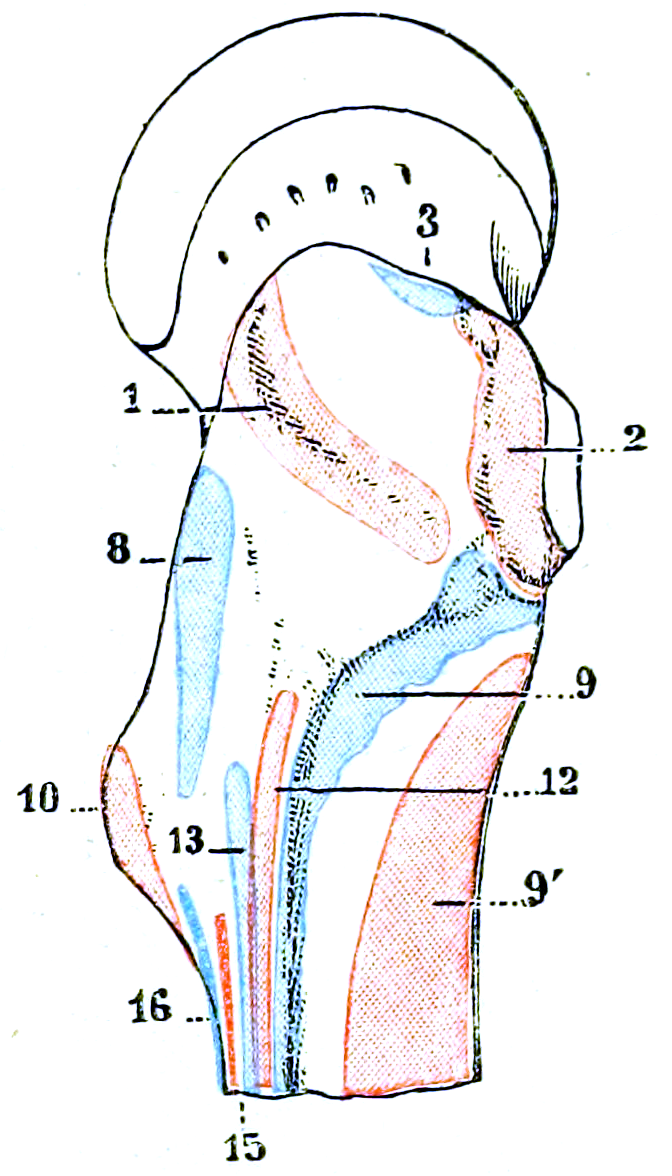
Origin and attachment areas at the proximal femur. Gluteus maximus is marked with number 12.

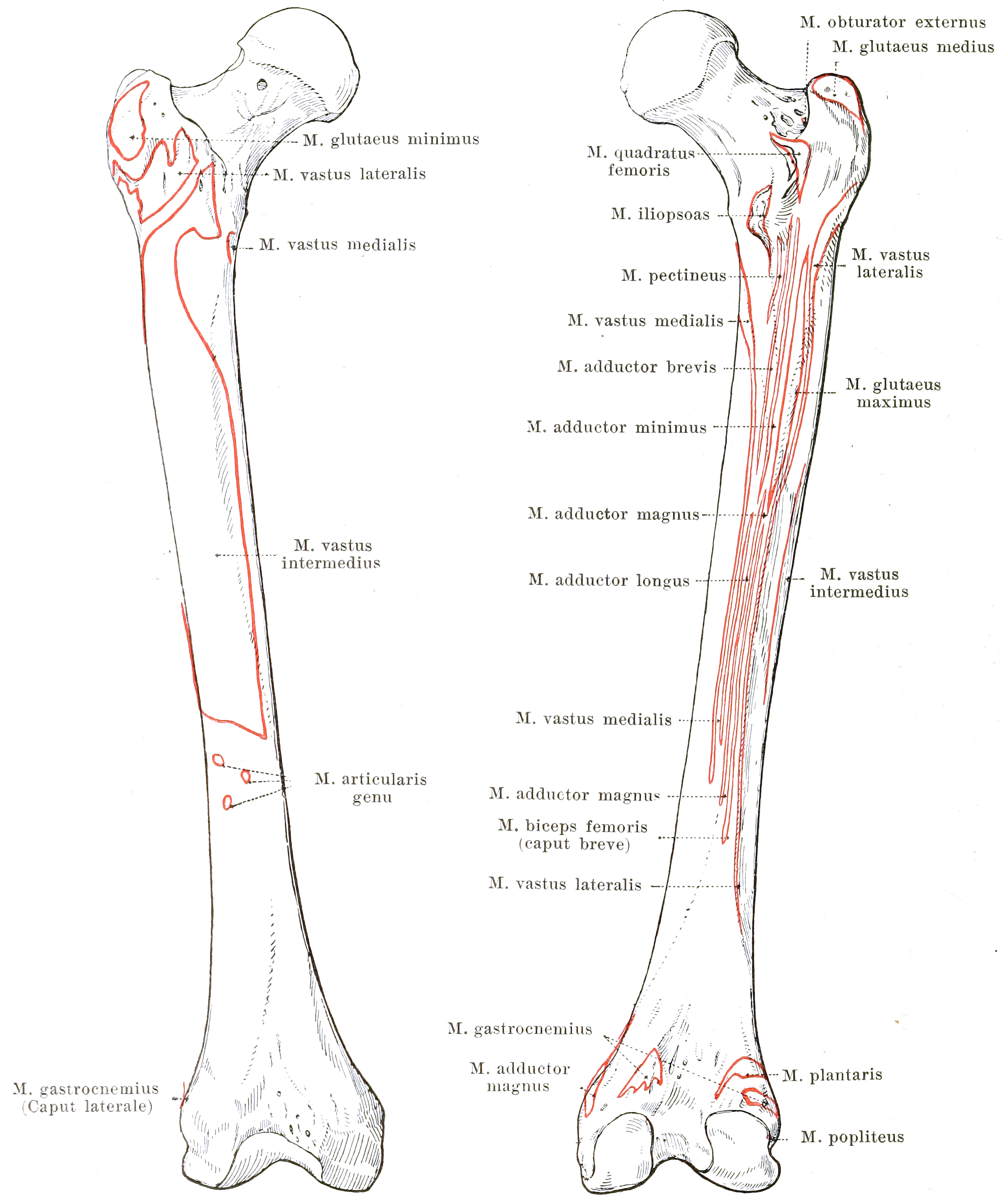
Attachment zone at the femur

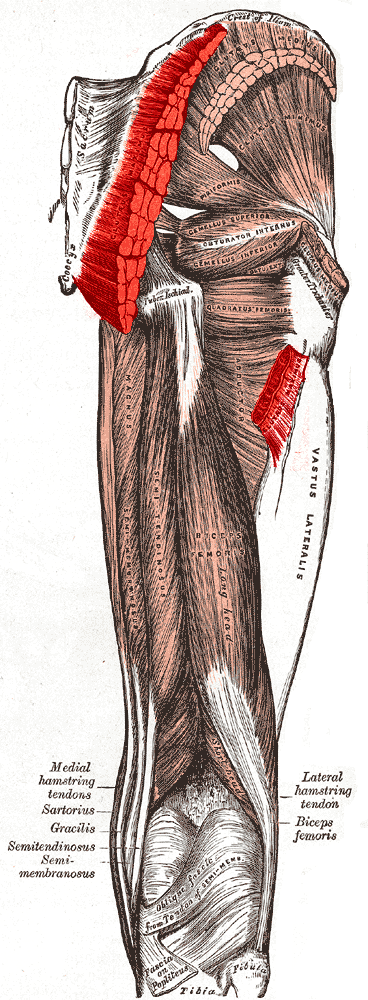
Muscles of the gluteal and posterior femoral regions, showing origin and insertion of gluteus maximus muscle

=== Bursae ===
Three bursae are usually found in relation with the deep surface of this muscle:

- One of these, of large size, separates it from the greater trochanter (Bursa trochanterica m. glutaei maximi),
- a second (often missing) is situated on the tuberosity of the ischium (Bursae glutaeofemorales),
- a third is found between the skin and the tendon of the muscle, which sometimes extends to the vastus lateralis (Bursa trochanterica subcutanea.

== Function ==
The gluteus maximus straightens the leg at the hip; when the leg is flexed at the hip, the gluteus maximus extends it to bring the leg into a straight line with the body. The anus also aligns when the leg is flexed at the hip, making the muscle tighten and the pelvis tilt forward. Taking its fixed point from below, it acts upon the pelvis, supporting it and the trunk upon the head of the femur; this is particularly obvious in standing on one leg. Its most powerful action is to cause the body to regain the erect position after stooping, by drawing the pelvis backward, being assisted in this action by the biceps femoris (long head), semitendinosus, semimembranosus, and adductor magnus.

The lower part of the muscle also acts as an adductor and external rotator of the limb. The upper fibers act as abductors of the hip joints.

The gluteus maximus is a tensor of the fascia lata, and by its connection with the iliotibial band steadies the femur on the articular surfaces of the tibia during standing, when the extensor muscles are relaxed. Therefore, the muscle carries out an extension, a valgisation and an external rotation of the knee.

== Society and culture ==
=== Training ===
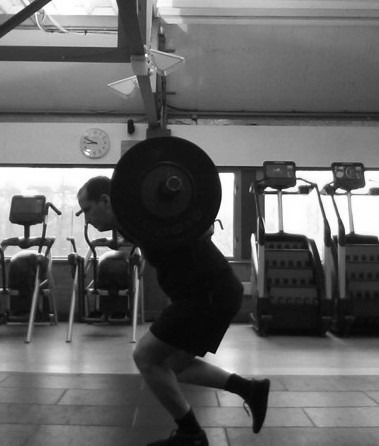
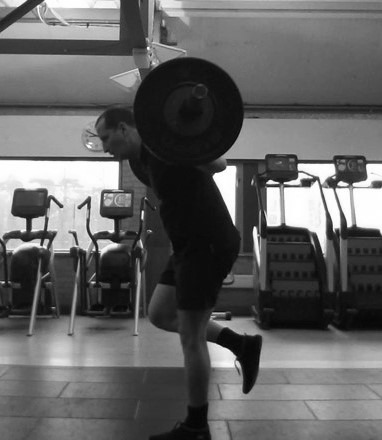
A unilateral (single leg) barbell back squat with the raised foot positioned behind. The bar is held in the low bar style. Squats precipitate high levels of gluteal muscle activation.

The gluteus maximus is involved in several sports, from running to weight-lifting. A number of exercises focus on the gluteus maximus and other muscles of the upper leg:

- Hip thrusts
- Glute bridge
- Quadruped hip extensions
- Kettlebell swings
- Squats and variations like split squats, unilateral squats with the raised foot positioned either backwards or forwards (pistols), and wide-stance lunges
- Deadlift (and variations)
- Reverse hyperextension
- Four-way hip extensions
- Glute-ham raise

=== In art ===
In cultural terms, the glutes are often considered a symbol of health and strength, and aesthetically appealing. They frequently feature in artwork which seeks to emphasise and celebrate physicality, and the ability to move dynamically and powerfully. They are usually shown to be efficiently proportioned and prominent.

Evidence of such depictions of the gluteal muscles extends from at least Ancient Greece to the modern day.

The glutes in art

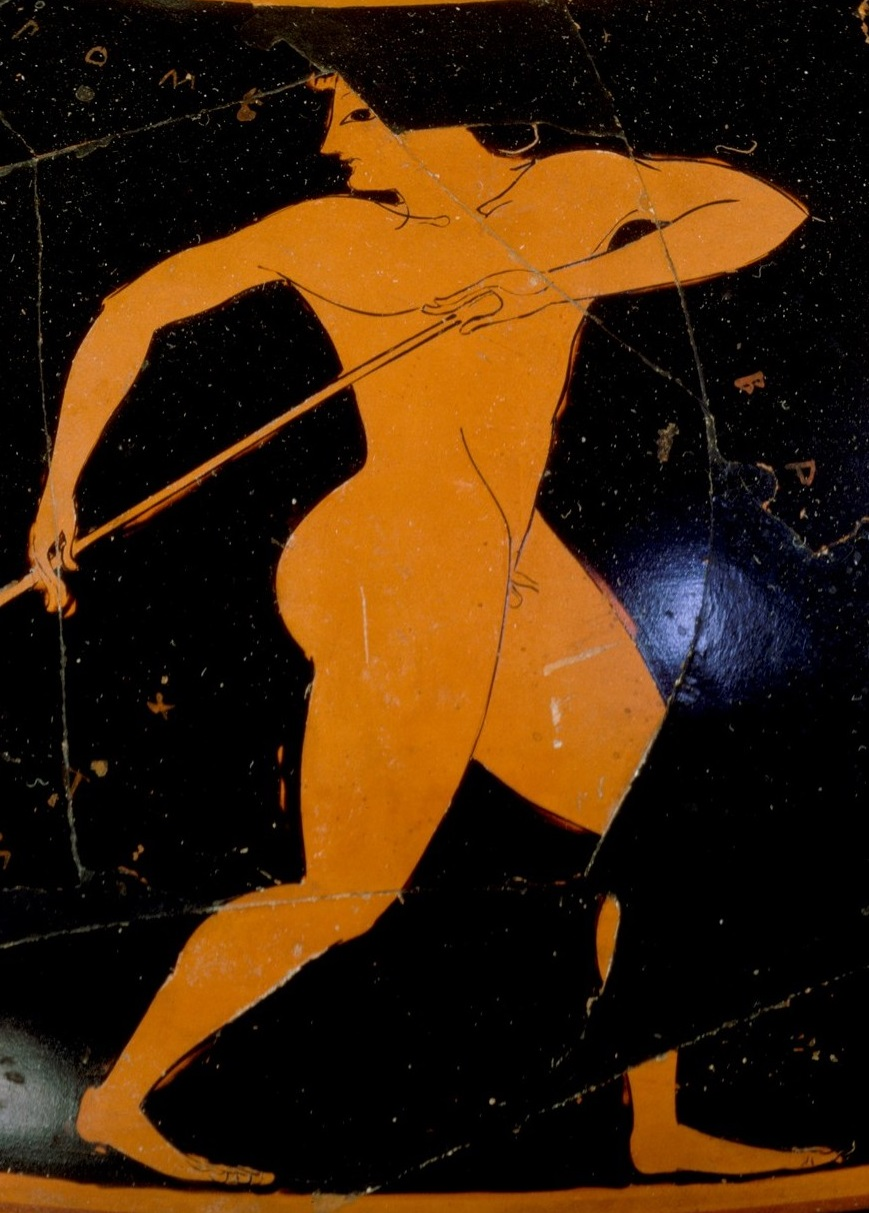
An Ancient Greek javelin thrower represented on a vase, c. 520 B.C.

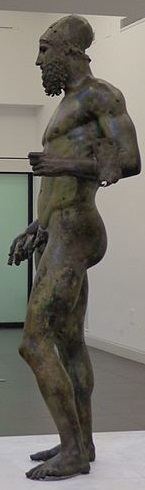
An Ancient Greek warrior in bronze. Riace Bronzes, c. 450 B.C.

== Clinical significance ==
Functional assessment can be useful in assessing injuries to the gluteus maximus and surrounding muscles.

The 30-second chair-to-stand test measures a participant's ability to stand up from a seated position as many times as possible in a thirty-second period of time. Testing the number of times a person can stand up in a thirty-second period helps assess strength, flexibility, pain, and endurance, which can help determine how far along a person is in rehabilitation, or how much work is still to be done.

The piriformis test measures flexibility of the gluteus maximus. This requires a trained professional and is based on the angle of external and internal rotation in relation to normal range of motion without injury or impingement.

== Other animals ==
The gluteus maximus is larger in size and thicker in humans than in other primates. Specifically, it is approximately 1.6 times larger relative to body mass compared to chimpanzees and comprises about 18.3% of total hip musculature mass versus 11.7% in chimpanzees. Its large size is one of the most characteristic features of the muscular system in humans, connected as it is with the power of maintaining the trunk in the erect posture. Other primates have much flatter hips and cannot sustain standing erectly.

In other primates, the correlate to the human gluteus maximus consists of the ischiofemoralis, a small muscle that corresponds to the human gluteus maximus and originates from the ilium and the ligaments of the sacroiliac, and the gluteus maximus proprius, a large muscle that extends from the ischial tuberosity to a relatively more distant insertion on the femur. In adapting to bipedal gait, reorganization of the attachment of the muscle as well as the moment arm was required.

== Running ==
The human gluteus maximus plays multiple important functional roles, particularly in running rather than walking. During running, it helps control trunk flexion, aids in decelerating the swing leg, and contributes to hip extension. During level walking, the muscle shows minimal activity, suggesting its enlargement was not primarily adapted for walking.

The muscle's size and position make it uniquely suited for controlling trunk position during rapid movements and stabilizing the trunk against flexion. While traditionally associated with maintaining erect posture, evidence suggests its enlargement was more likely selected for its role in running capability and trunk stabilization during various dynamic activities. These adaptations would have been particularly important for activities like running and climbing in early human evolution.

== Additional images ==
All gluteal muscles, maximus in yellow

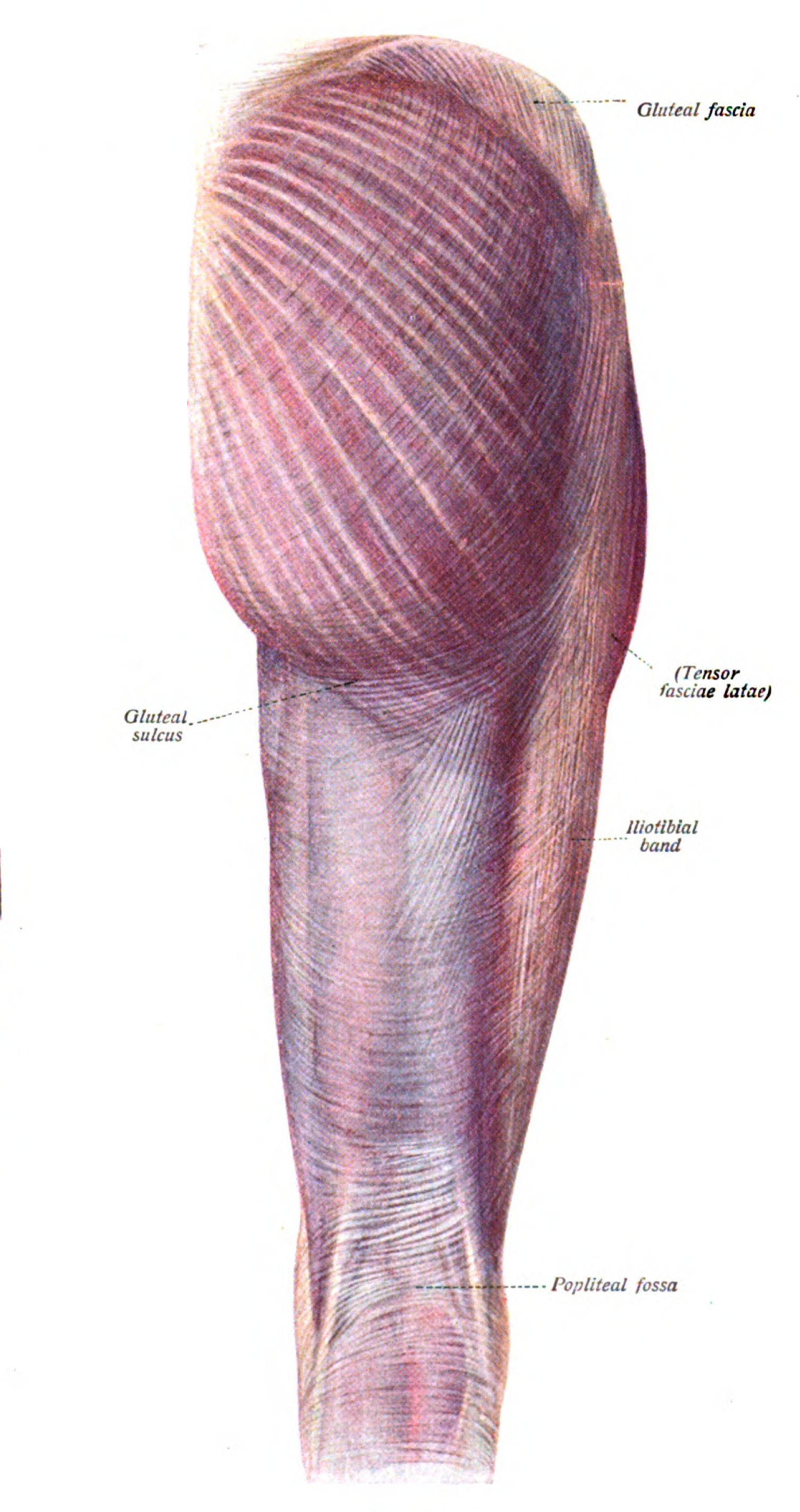
Gluteus maximus is the most superficial muscle of the hips, here visible at top centre with skin removed from the entire right leg. Note its rather thin fascia.

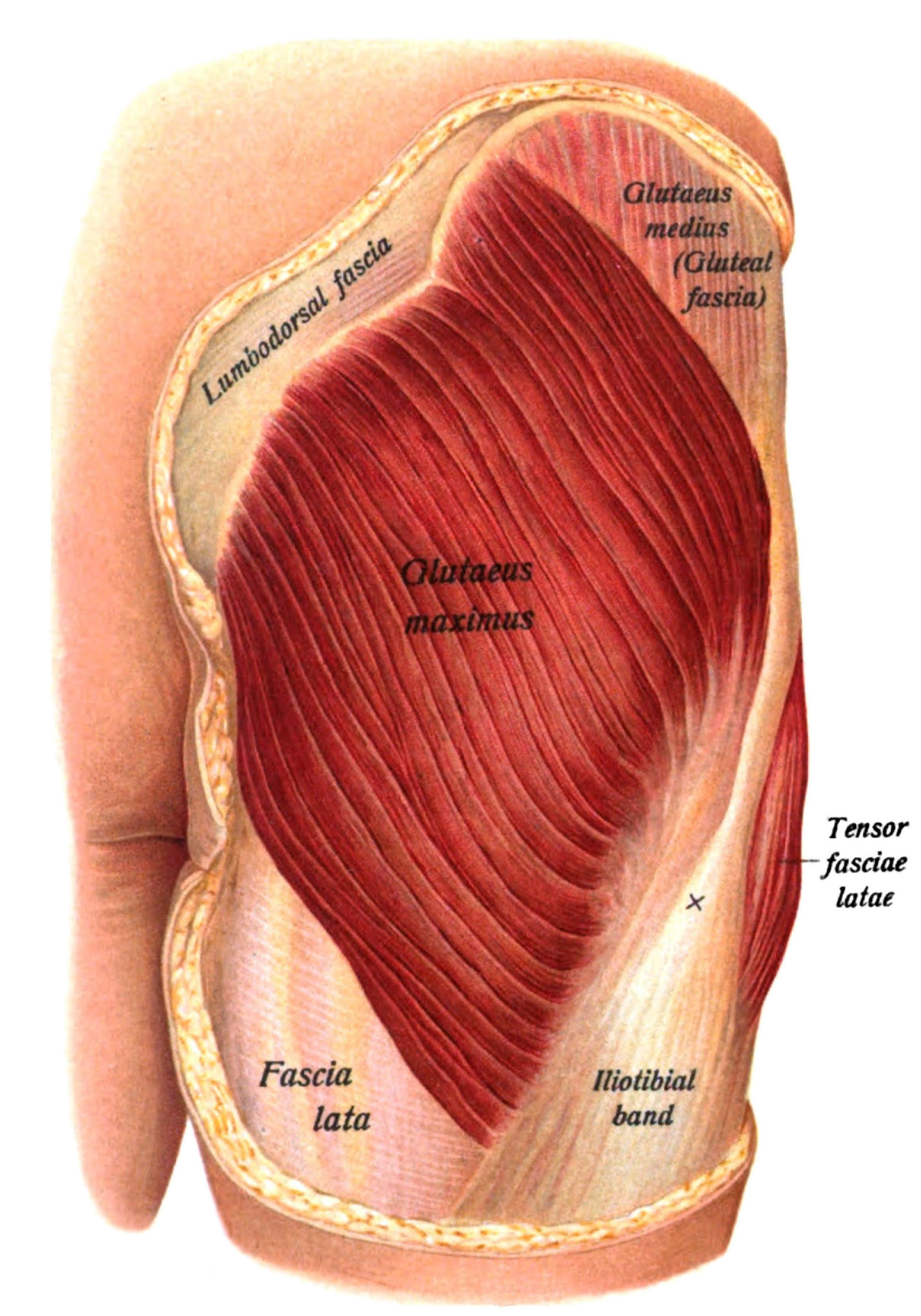
The gluteus maximus, with surrounding fascia. Right buttock, viewed from behind, skin covering removed.

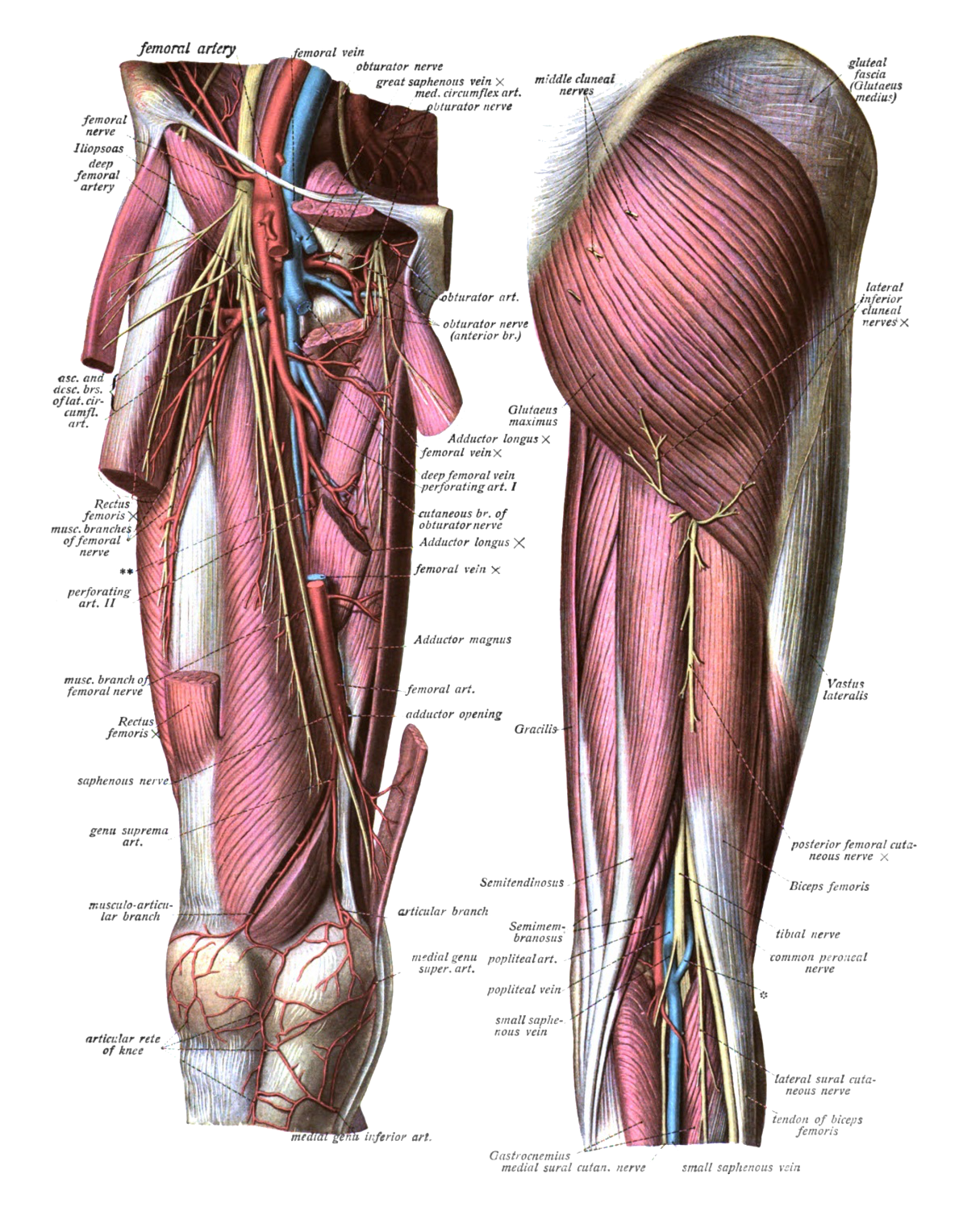
Innervation and blood-supply of the gluteus maximus

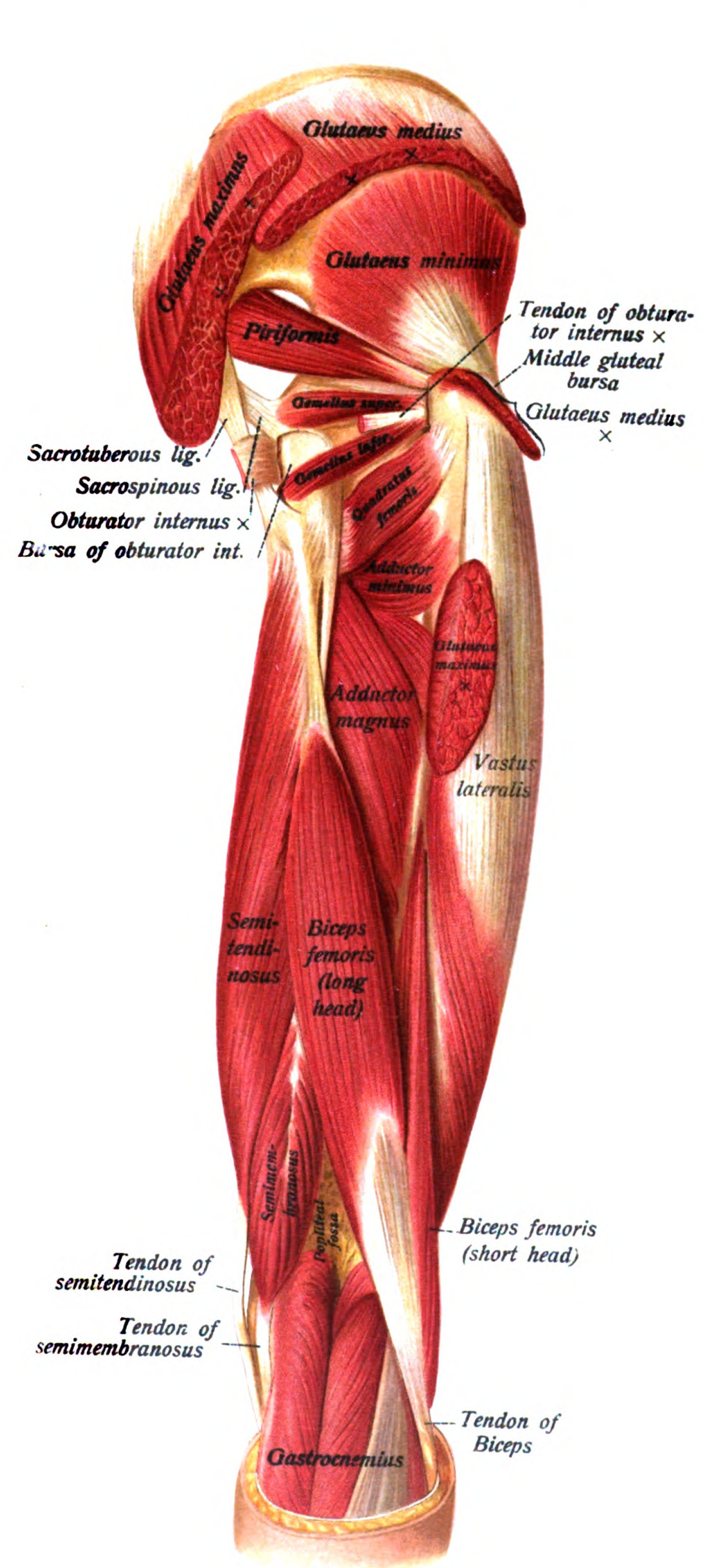
Gluteus maximus cut showing underlying structures

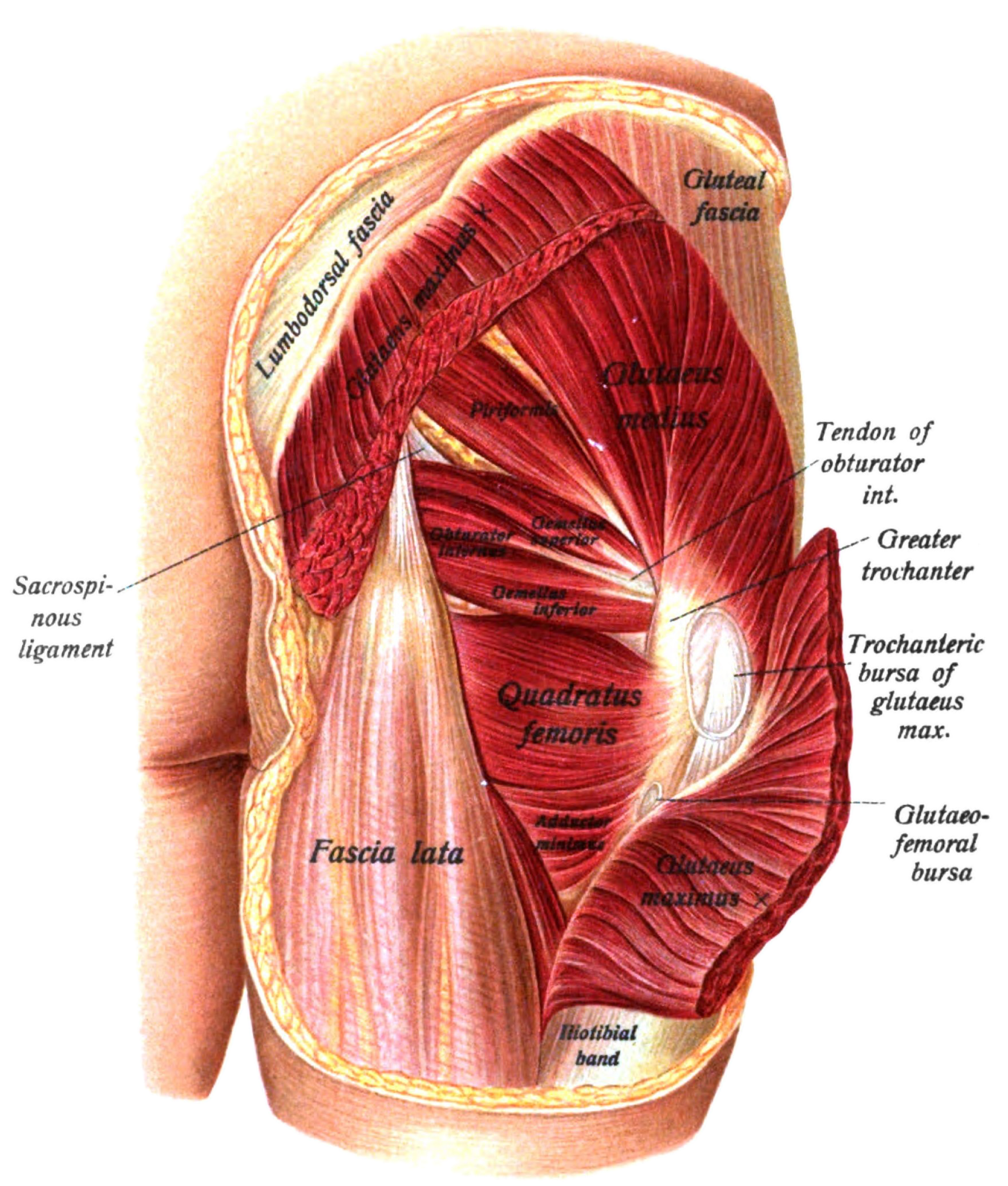
Structures visible under the gluteus maximus

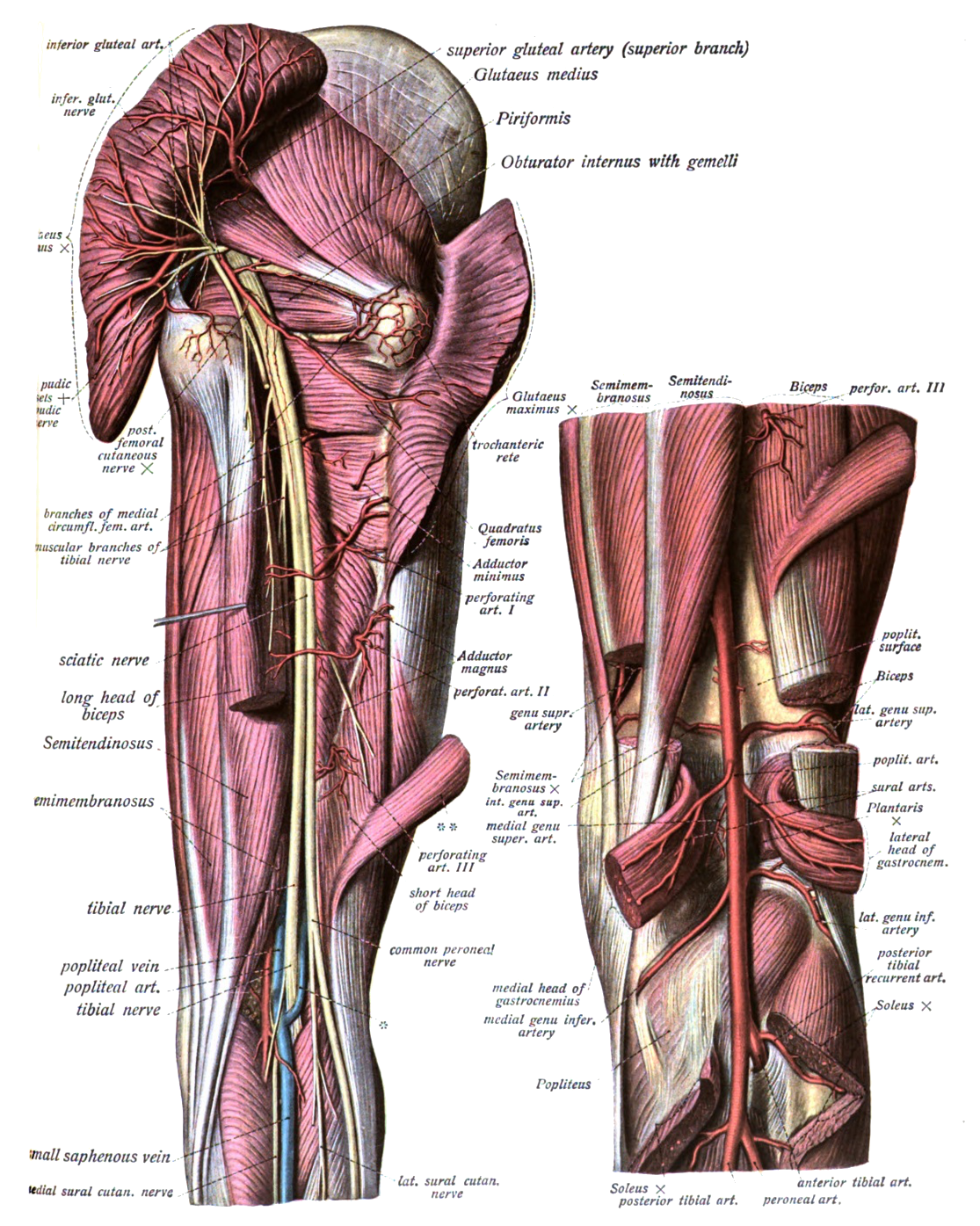
Innervation as seen from under the gluteus maximus

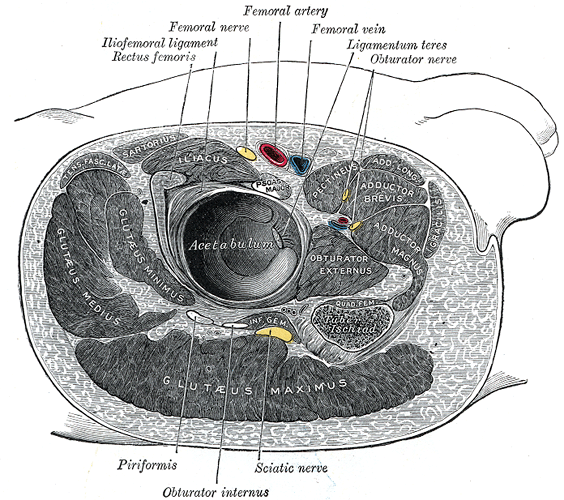
Structures surrounding right hip-joint (gluteus maximus visible at bottom)

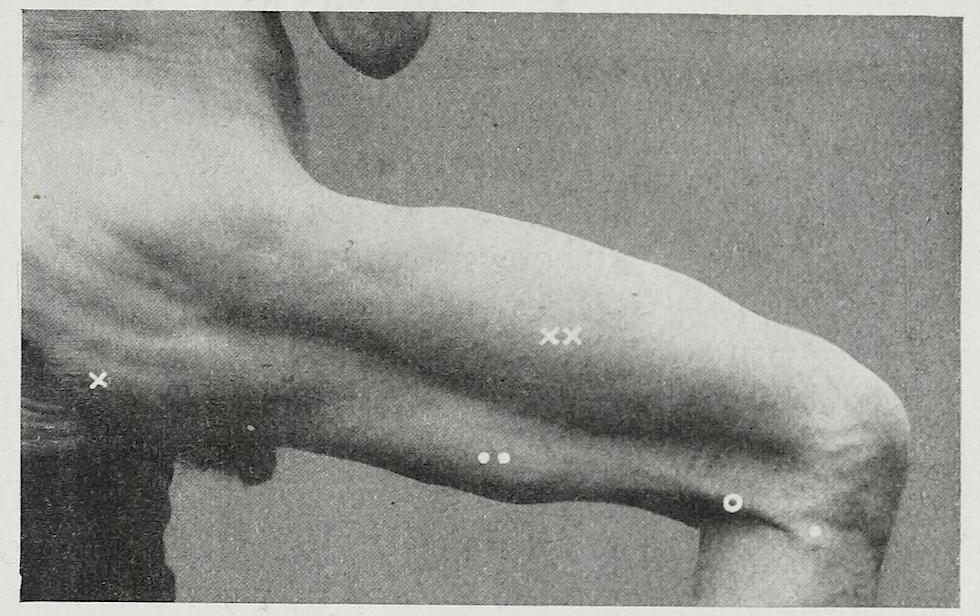
Surface anatomy of the upper leg, lateral view. x = Gluteus maximus, xx = Vastus lateralis, .. = Biceps femoris, . = Tendon of the biceps femoris / Capitulum fibulae.

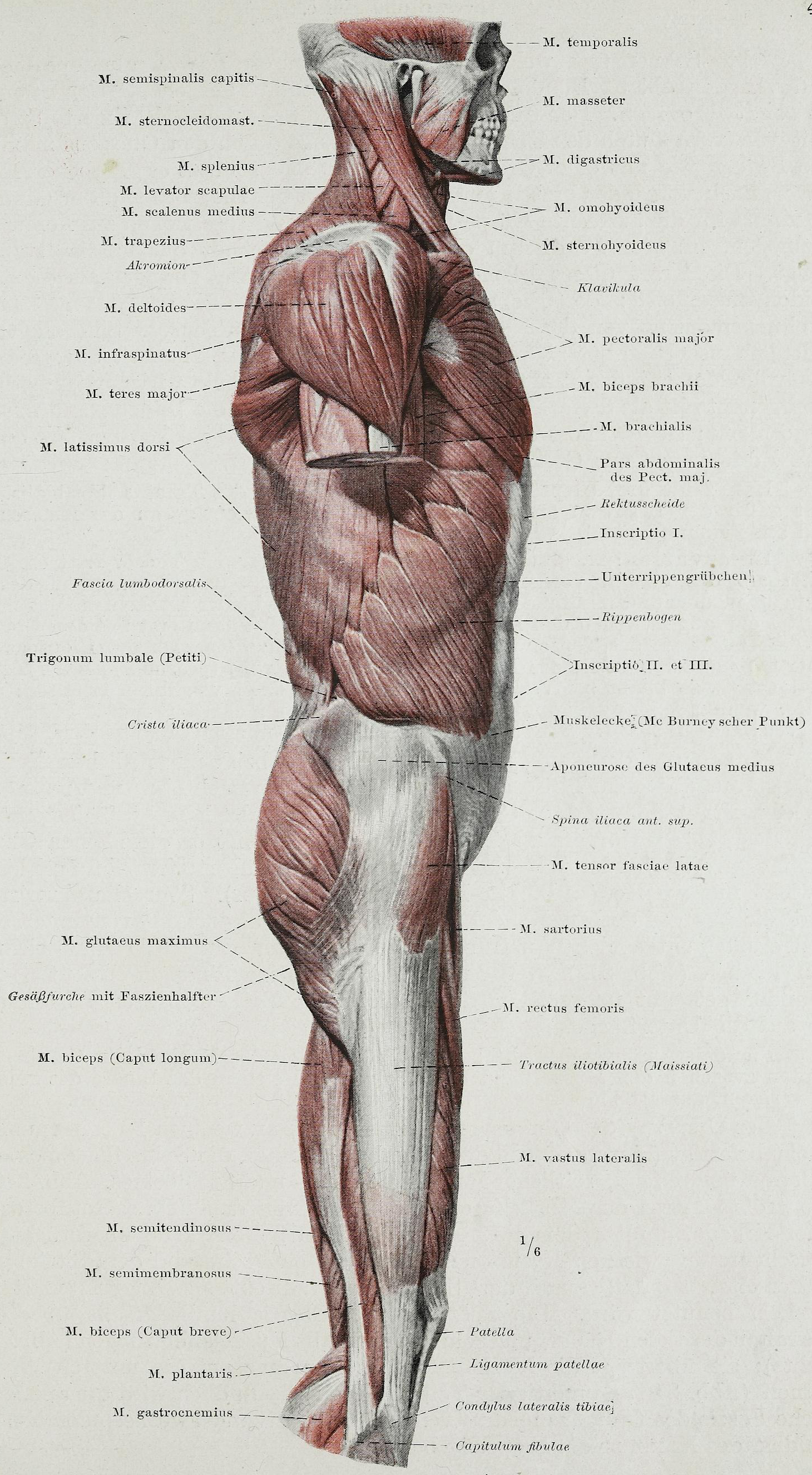
Superficial muscles of the body, lateral view

== See also ==
- List of skeletal muscles of the human body
