= Kettlebell swing =

Exercise

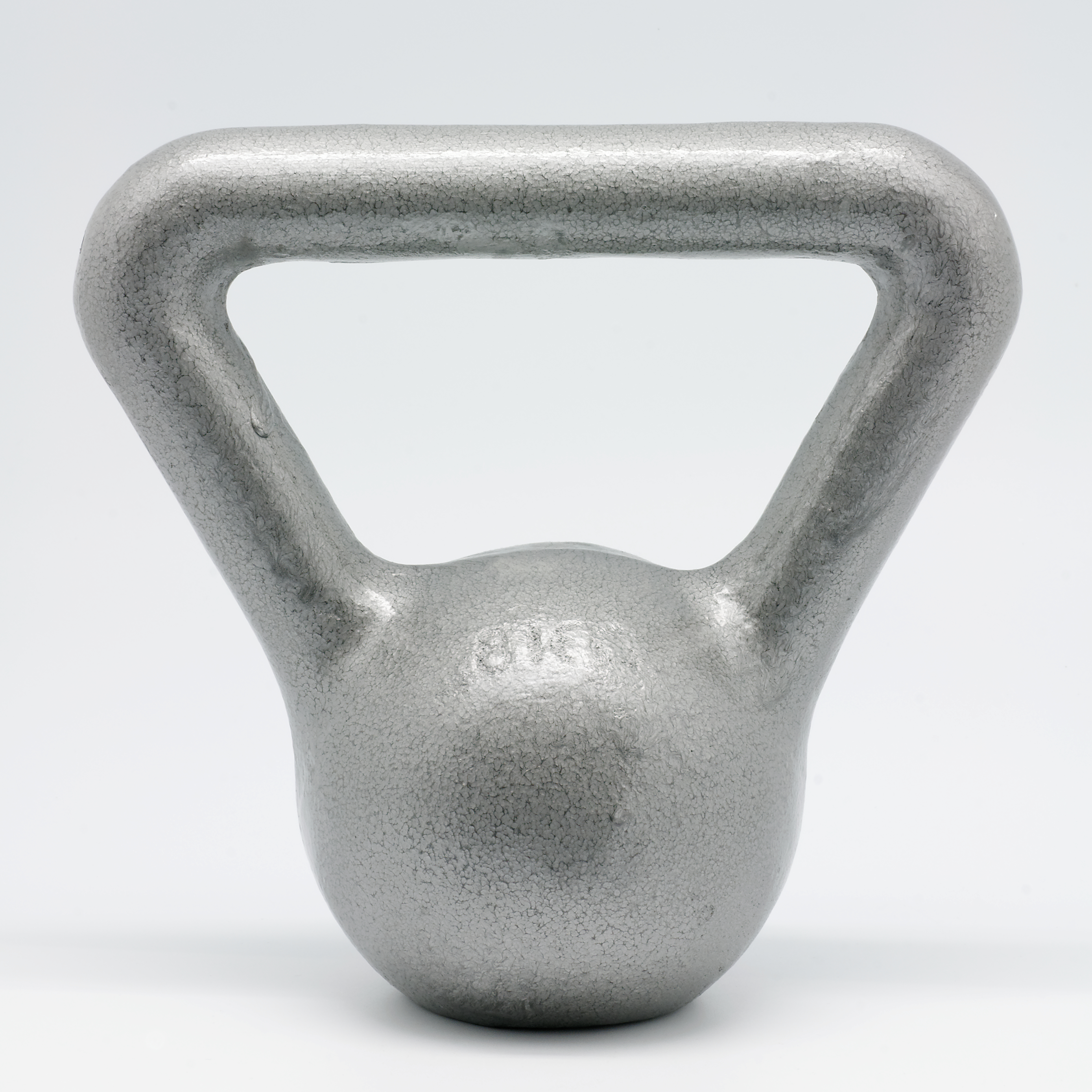
An 8kg kettlebell

Kettlebell swing (also known as Russian swing, double-arm swing or conventional kettlebell swing) is a basic ballistic exercise used to train the posterior chain in a manner similar to broad jumping. It involves moving the bell in a pendulum motion from between the knees to anywhere between eye level to fully overhead and can be performed either two-handed or using one hand. There are three versions of kettlebell swing: Russian Swing, American Swing and Sport Style Swing.

== Overview ==
Kettlebell swing - Hinge-based style

The kettlebell is swung from just below the groin to somewhere between the upper abdomen and shoulders, with arms straight or slightly bent, the degree of flexion depends on the trajectory of the kettlebell. The key to a good kettlebell swing is effectively thrusting the hips, not bending too much at the knees and sending the weight forwards, as opposed to squatting the weight up, or lifting up with the arms. This requires an intense contraction of the gluteal, abdominal and latissimus muscles. The swing can also be performed with a release and catch of the kettlebell, which helps train the proper swing pattern where the arms aren't pulling up at the top. This can be done with two hands switching to a supinated catch. The one-arm swing presents a significant anti-twisting challenge, and can be used with an alternating catch switching between arms. Further variations include the walking swing taking a step forward at the apex of each swing, the outside swing where the kettlebell swings outside the leg, and the kneeling swing, swinging between the legs in a one-leg half-kneeling position.

There is controversy within the kettlebell world about whether a swing can only be performed with a hip hinge, and not with a squat. Within the kettlebell sport world, employing knee flexion during the swing is more common.

== Types and variations ==
There are two types of kettlebell swings:

- Hardstyle kettlebell swing (Hinge-based) – a hinge pattern which primarily utilizes the muscles of the posterior chain (hamstrings and glutes). It should be practised with a good ground connection for stability and power production; a flat sole shoe or barefoot is preferred when performing swings.
- Kettlebell sport swing (Pendulum-based) – the motion of the kettlebell sport swing is double knee bend compared to the focused hip hinging motion of the hardstyle swing. This allows for stretch reflex from hamstrings to help scoop the bell up, ensures upward trajectory.

There are many variations of the kettlebell swing, some are, but not limited to:

- single arm swing
- one kettlebell double arm swing
- two kettlebells double arm swing
- suitcase swing
- swing squat style
- high swing

Within those variations there are plenty more variations, some are, but not limited to:

- pace
- movement
- speed
- power
- grip
- direction of thumb
- elbow flexion
- knee flexion

== Benefits ==
Kettlebell swing benefits include:

- Increased Power
- Increased Muscular Endurance
- Increased Aerobic Capacity
- Increased Anaerobic Capacity
