= World Push Up Championships =

Annual push-up tournament in Wellington, New Zealand

The World Push Up Championships is an annual push-up tournament held in Wellington, New Zealand. The championships include separate competition for men and women. Male competitors are judged on the number of push-ups they can complete in a one-minute period. The time limit in the ladies competition is 45 seconds.

== Origin ==
The inaugural World Push Up Championships were held in the Establishment Bar, Courtenay Place, Wellington on March 28, 2009. Originally envisaged as a fund raiser for the Wellington/Hutt Valley GAA club, the event became an entity in its own right while still raising money for the Wellington/Hutt Valley GAA club. Early contestants Daithí "Dizzle" O'Connor and Callum "Tick Tock" Thomas helped raise an early profile for the competition by posting challenges on YouTube. The event was further publicised in the Wellington region through a morning television appearance, radio slots, national media, and regional event guides.

== Judging ==
A push-up was declared to be valid if the contestant pressed their body down on a judge's fist and pushed up until their elbows locked. A two-man judging team counted the push-ups. The first was the judge with his fist on the mat; he/she counted the number of times the contestant pressed down on his/her fist, giving the contestant a "raw score.". The second judge counted the number of times a contestant rose without locking their arms, giving the contestant a "fault count.". The final score is raw score minus fault count.
