= Anterior chain =

Group of muscles on the anterior of the body

The anterior chain, which comprises the antagonists of the posterior chain, refers to the group of skeletal muscles that lies on the front of the human body. This includes the biceps, the pectoralis major and pectoralis minor (chest) muscles, the abdominals, the obliques, the serratus anterior, and the quadriceps.

Beach muscles are muscles developed for the purpose of looking good and largely consist of the muscles of the anterior chain. This is because it is these muscles that are seen from the front (or in a mirror) and are thus the most noticeable to an observer.
