= George Kotsimpos =

Athlete and push-up record holder (born 1977)

- George Kotsimpos during a practice session in 2025.

Personal information
- Full name: George Konstantinou Kotsimpos
- Nationality: Greek, Canadian
- Born: 15 June 1977 (age 49) Medicine Hat, Alberta, Canada
- Education: Bachelor's degree in Informatics, Doctorate in Informatics

Sport
- Country: Greece
- Sport: Fitness
- Partner: Apostolos Dervas (tandem push ups )

George Kotsimpos (Greek: Γεώργιος Κοτσιμπός, born June 15, 1977) is a Greek-Canadian fitness athlete. He is mainly known for his push-up skills. He has achieved 16 Guinness World Records in the world of physical fitness. His achievements include variations of push-ups performed on unstable surfaces, such as medicine balls, which require strength, balance, and body control.

== Training method ==
Kotsimpos trains under the "Iron Body" philosophy. He was coached by Kostas Stathopoulos, who has held in the past the Guinness World Record for the "Most diamond push-ups on medicine balls in one minute". When asked about his workout program in a TV interview, Kotsimpos said "My training is a blend of calisthenics, resistance training and core strength building". He also explained about his training approach that, "it emphasizes on a combination of exercises that build the core muscles of the body, mainly using medicine balls and swiss balls".

George Kotsimpos performs a push-up variation on unstable surfaces during his workout (2025).

== Athletic achievements ==
Kotsimpos has broken 16 Guinness World Records in fitness exercises. The first in December 2020 for the "Most hand release push ups in one minute (male)" by performing 64 push-ups in one minute, 6 more than the previous record.

The second in December 2022 for the "Most consecutive tandem push ups (male)" with his fellow athlete Apostolos Dervas, performing 43 push-ups while carrying out the exercise together. They outnumbered the previous holders by 4 repetitions.

In September 2023, he secured his third Guinness World Record for the "Most consecutive tandem push-ups (male)" alongside fellow athlete Apostolos Dervas again. They executed 51 push-ups, surpassing their own previous record by 8 repetitions. “This is an extremely difficult achievement due to hard work and unwavering determination,” said George Kotsimpos. “We had faith in our abilities and knew we could break the 50-rep mark.”

In November 2023, Kotsimpos, alongside training partner Apostolos Dervas, claimed on the same day, two further Guinness World Records for tandem knuckle push-ups (male). They achieved 40 repetitions for the "Most consecutive tandem knuckle push-ups" and 46 repetitions for the "Most tandem knuckle push-ups in one minute". Kotsimpos said about the difficulty of the exercise: "It is unexpectedly difficult. We didn't expect the knuckle push-ups to be so challenging. We were forced to find answers to questions we didn't know we would face."

In January 2024, Kotsimpos broke his sixth Guinness World Record for the "Most push-ups on medicine balls in one minute (male)". He performed 100 push-ups in a minute, becoming the first athlete in history to reach the three-digit milestone. In a statement, he expressed, “It is a tremendous honor for me to achieve such a feat. It was a lifelong dream, and I worked hard to make it happen.”

In March 2024, George Kotsimpos broke three additional Guinness world records in push-up exercises on medicine balls. First, he set a new record for the "Most push-ups (one leg raised) on medicine balls in one minute (male)," with 96 reps. He then improved his own record for the "Most push-ups on medicine balls in one minute (male)," achieving 112 reps, 12 more than his previous best. Finally, he broke the record for the "Most decline push-ups on medicine balls in one minute (male)," with 76 reps, where the rear medicine ball was placed on a 50 cm plyometric box. Regarding the difficulty of the exercises, Kotsimpos stated: "It's extremely challenging and requires years of training to be able to perform so many repetitions with proper form in just 60 seconds. These strength and stability exercises demand a consistently high rate of execution and significantly elevate heart rate. The last 10 seconds feel like an eternity due to the intense exertion."

In September 2024, George Kotsimpos broke his own Guinness World Record for the "Most push-ups (with one leg raised) on medicine balls in one minute (male)" by adding 5 more repetitions. With an impressive 101 push-ups in just 60 seconds, he became the first fitness athlete in history to surpass the remarkable milestone of 100 repetitions within the one-minute timeframe. After achieving his 10th Guinness World Record, George Kotsimpos stated: "I am incredibly grateful to have been able to break this record. The journey to this point was filled with hard work, discipline, and dedication. Achieving the most push-ups on medicine balls (with one leg raised) in one minute was a tremendous challenge that required precision, balance, and strength. All records are meant to be broken. My goal was to raise the bar as high as possible for future contenders. With 101 push-ups in one minute, I believe I have succeeded in doing so."

In November 2024, George Kotsimbos broke his own Guinness World Record, in the category “Most decline push-ups on medicine balls in one minute (male)”. Improving on his previous record of 76 repetitions, he reached 79 push-ups within 60 seconds. “The main reason I always worked out was for my health. For longevity and well-being. The records came as a natural result of trying to stay in shape, but my primary goal has always been quality of life,” stated George Kotsimpos, highlighting that every new record is part of his continuous journey of self-improvement and discipline.

In December 2024, George Kotsimpos achieved his 11th Guinness World Record, setting a new global benchmark for the "Most decline push-ups (one leg raised) on medicine balls in one minute (male)", with a total of 55 repetitions completed within the 60-second time frame. This specific variation of the push-up is recognized for its exceptionally high level of difficulty and risk, due to the combined instability of the medicine balls, the inclined (decline) body angle, and the unilateral support caused by raising one leg. Successfully executing this movement demands outstanding upper-body strength, core stability, neuromuscular coordination, and precise balance under time constraints. “Every record is a challenge that drives me to improve,” Kotsimpos stated following the attempt. “It’s not solely about physical strength, but primarily about mental resilience and belief in one’s own capacity. Breaking limits is a ongoing process of personal evolution.”

In September 2025, George Kotsimpos achieved his 13th Guinness World Record, setting a new global benchmark in the category “Most decline push-ups (one leg raised) on medicine balls in one minute (male),” with a total of 59 repetitions completed within the 60-second time frame. This performance surpassed his own previous world record of 55 repetitions, further extending his dominance in one of the most technically demanding and high-risk push-up variations. The exercise combines multiple difficulty factors, including unstable support on medicine balls, an elevated decline body position, and unilateral load due to the raised leg, requiring exceptional upper-body strength, core stability, neuromuscular coordination, and precise balance under time pressure. Reflecting on the achievement, Kotsimpos emphasized that continuous improvement remains central to his approach, viewing each record not as a final destination but as part of an ongoing journey of personal development and physical refinement.

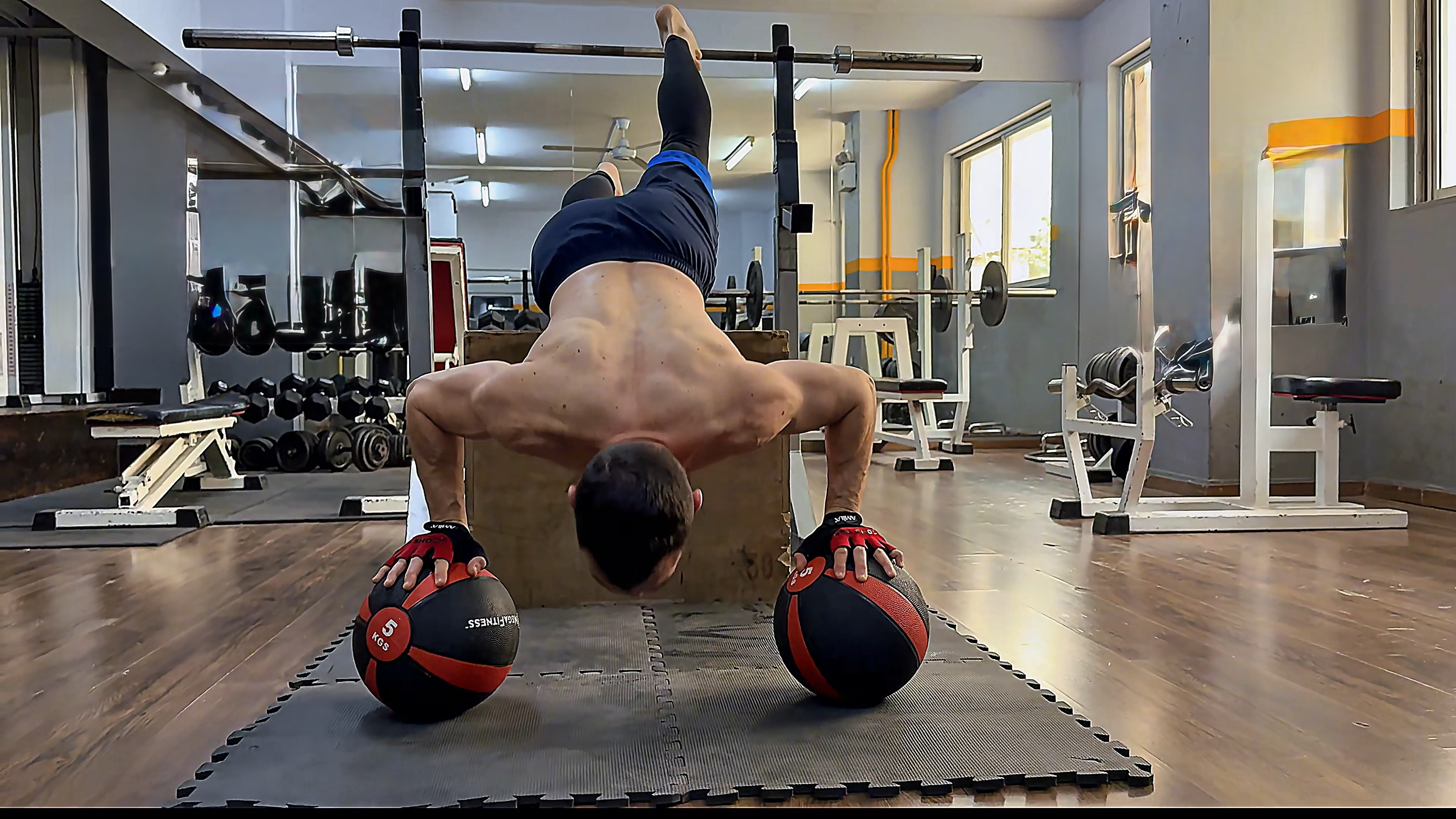
George Kotsimpos performing decline push-ups (one leg raised) on medicine balls for his Guinness World Record attempt (2025). He broke his own previous record.

In November 2025, George Kotsimpos achieved the 14th Guinness World Record of his career by setting a new world record in the category “Most decline push-ups on medicine balls in one minute (male),” with a total of 83 valid repetitions completed within 60 seconds. This achievement marked the third consecutive time that the same athlete had broken the same world record, progressively improving upon his previous top performances of 76 and 79 repetitions.

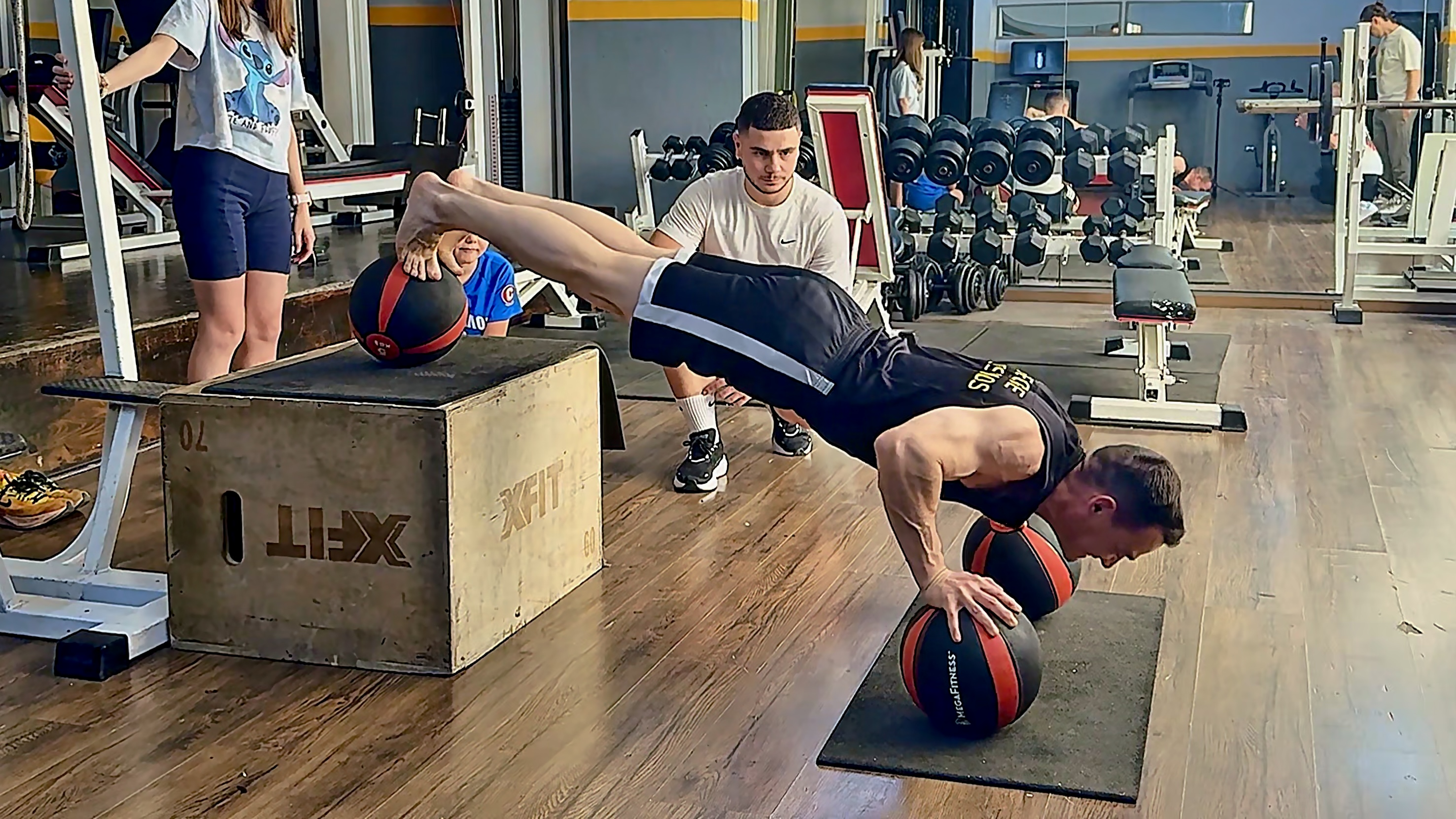
George Kotsimpos performing decline push-ups on medicine balls for his Guinness World Record attempt (2025). He broke his own previous record.

In March 2026, he secured his fifteenth Guinness World Record for the “Most consecutive tandem knuckle push-ups (male)”, once again alongside fellow athlete Apostolos Dervas. Together, they completed 45 consecutive push-ups, breaking the previous record by three repetitions. The two athletes stated, “We are not simply trying to do more push-ups. We are striving to become better as a team. Every record shows us that we can push a little further beyond what we once believed was our limit.” This statement reflects the philosophy that drives their achievements.

In April 2026, he set his 16th Guinness World Record in the “Most tandem knuckle push-ups in one minute (male)” category, together with his longtime training partner, Apostolos Dervas. The two athletes completed 47 push-ups in one minute, improving their own previous world record. “Each push-up counted twice: once toward the record and once toward the trust it takes to move in sync with your training partner,” Kotsimpos said.

George Kotsimpos and Apostolos Dervas performing tandem knuckle push ups for their Guinness World Record attempt (2026).

== Health and injuries ==
Kotsimpos has sustained severe injuries twice during his athletic career. The first injury occurred nine months before his first Guinness World Record attempt, when he cut four flexor tendons of his right forearm in an accident. The second injury occurred about one year prior to his second record attempt when he sustained a shoulder injury, which led to arthroscopy. Kotsimpos has fully recovered from both his injuries.

== Educational Activities ==
Kotsimpos and his longtime training partner, Apostolos Dervas, have given presentations to students about their Guinness World Records and the training involved in achieving them. The presentations aim to promote physical activity and encourage students to pursue goals through persistence, healthy habits and teamwork. They have included discussions of exercise, nutrition and training, demonstrations of some of the exercises, and opportunities for students to ask questions and try them.

== Personal life ==
Kotsimpos is married and has two children. He and his family reside in Heraklion, Greece. Kotsimpos holds a Bachelor's degree as well as a Doctorate in Informatics from the University of Piraeus. He works as an IT specialist.
