= Posterior chain =

Group of muscles on the posterior of the body

The posterior chain is a group of muscles on the posterior of the body. Examples of these muscles include the hamstrings, the gluteus maximus, erector spinae muscle group, trapezius, and posterior deltoids.

== Exercises ==
The primary exercises for developing the posterior chain are the Olympic lifts, squats, good-mornings, bent-over rows, deadlifts, pull-ups and hyperextensions. The common denominator among many of these movements is a focus on hip extension, excluding bent-over rows and pull ups. Working on hamstrings is also important.
