= Spermatic fascia =

The spermatic fascia is a bilayered fascia covering the testis; both layers are derived from abdominal muscle or fascia.

- The more superficial of these two layers, the external spermatic fascia, lies deep to the skin and dartos fascia of the testes, superficial to the cremaster muscle, and is a continuation of the aponeurosis of the external oblique muscle.
- The deeper internal spermatic fascia is deep to the cremaster muscle, directly surrounds the spermatic cord and its contents, and is a continuation of the abdominal transversalis fascia.
