= Orchiopexy =

Surgery to fix a testicle into the scrotum

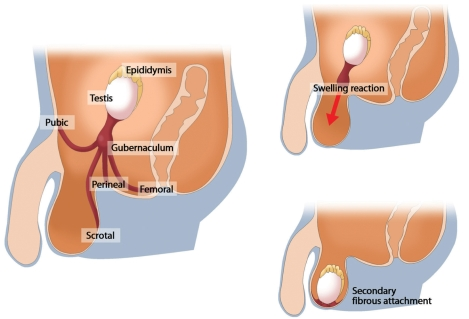
- Evolution of orchiopexy

Orchiopexy (or orchidopexy) is a surgery to move and/or permanently fix a testicle into the scrotum. While orchiopexy typically describes the operation to surgically correct an undescended testicle, it is also used to resolve testicular torsion.

== Indications ==
=== Undescended testicle ===
Undescended testicles affect 1% of males and present bilaterally in 10% of those cases. The cause is unknown, with a small percentage associated with developmental abnormalities or chromosomal aberrations.

Early orchiopexy reduces the risks for cancer and sterility in males with cryptorchidism, or undescended testes.

Cryptorchidism is definitively diagnosed after 1 year of age, as testicular descent may occur after birth. Surgical placement into the scrotum is recommended by 18 months to decrease the likelihood of testicular cancer, testicular atrophy, and sterility.

Cryptorchidism is associated with tubular atrophy and sterility. In addition, cryptorchid testes carry a three to five times higher risk for testicular cancer (germ cell neoplasia in situ within the atrophic tubules). Patients are at increased risk for the development of cancer and atrophy in the contralateral, normally descended testes as well.

There are multiple different orchiopexy techniques used to correct an undescended testicle due to the large variation in location where the testes may present. The procedures have a high overall success rate. In a university hospital (tertiary) setting with a high follow-up percentage and orchidopexy performed or supervised by a fellowship-trained pediatric urologist, the success rate of standard orchidopexy was 97%, for redo orchidopexy 94%, and for laparoscopic (staged) procedures 80%. These reported outcomes can be used in more accurate patient/parental counseling in daily clinical practice and guidelines.

=== Testicular torsion ===
Orchiopexy is performed in the event of testicular torsion, a urologic emergency presenting with intense pain and often without inciting injury.

While neonatal torsion occurs with no anatomic defect to account for its occurrence (occurring in utero or shortly after birth), adult torsion results from a bilateral congenital anomaly often called a "bell-clapper deformity", where the testis is abnormally anchored in the scrotal sac, leading to increased mobility.

Twisting of the spermatic cord results in obstruction of the testicular venous drainage. Intense vascular engorgement and infarction may lead to testicular injury and sterility. If the cord is manually untwisted within approximately six hours the testis has a high chance of remaining viable. One in three cases results in dead testes, requiring orchiectomy.

Surgical fixation in the form of orchiopexy is indicated to prevent the reoccurrence of torsion, and is usually performed bilaterally, even if only one testicle is affected by torsion. The procedure has a high success rate in preventing reoccurrence.

== Surgical techniques ==
=== For fixation of the undescended testes ===
For the management of palpable undescended testes (over 80% of undescended testes) the standard inguinal approach is the appropriate procedure.

Approximately 50% of non-palpable testis are high in the inguinal canal or abdominal, while the other 50% are atrophic, and usually located in the scrotum. Diagnostic laparoscopy is often advised to determine the location of non-palpable testis.

- Prescrotal orchiopexy is often used for low inguinal testes, reducing surgical time and patient discomfort as compared to other methods, while also reducing the risk of complications. Additionally, hernias and hydroceles can be successfully repaired during this procedure. This approach maintains the high success rate seen in other surgical methods.
- Standard open inguinal orchiopexy is most appropriate procedure for palpable testes. With this technique, the spermatic cord and testicular vessels can be easily visualized and a patent processus vaginalis can be easily corrected. This approach requires a second incision to secure the testicle within the scrotum (as compared to the prescrotal approach).
- Laparoscopic orchiopexy is best used for abdominal testis, while mobile/peeping testis distal to the inguinal ring should be approached with the standard one-stage laparoscopic or open orchiopexy. The major proposed benefits of laparoscopic orchiopexy are the possibility of high retroperitoneal dissection and/or rerouting the testes through a shorter pathway medial to the inferior epigastric vessels (called the "Prentiss maneuver") for a more favorable scrotal position. The benefits of both techniques is debated, with neither showing a difference in success rates. For palpable undescended testes, multi-study analysis has shown that there is no significant difference in safety or success rates between standard open inguinal and laparoscopic approaches, with the latter being more expensive and associated with a higher rate of complications (extensive high retroperitoneal dissection with scrotal hematomas and wound infection, Prentiss maneuvers with hemorrhage from epigastric vessels and wound infection).
- Fowler-Stephens orchiopexy is a two-stage procedure applied for high intra-abdominal testes (often with short vascular pedicle) or non-mobile testis. This method makes use of collateral blood supply to maintain testicular blood flow, allowed the testis to be brought down further to reach the scrotum without tension. Stage 1 involved vessel ligation (spermatic arteries, as well as inferior epigastric, cremasteric, and vas deferens arteries), with a period of 6 months to allow for collateral blood supply to develop. Stage 2 involved testicular mobilization and fixation within the dartos pouch, which is often performed with laparoscopy. The two-staged Fowler-Stephens is now performed as routine management for intra-abdominal testes at many institutions.
- Microvascular autotransplantation is another option for patients with intra-abdominal testes, particularly in those with bilateral undescended testes. This technique uses microvascular anastomosis to maximize testicular blood supply after mobilization of the testicles (to get around the high variability in blood supply can complicate the Fowler-Stephens procedure). It takes a lot of microvascular surgical skill, specialized instrumentation, and is a much longer procedure.

=== For fixation of testicular torsion ===
Two distinct techniques used for surgical fixation are the sutured point-fixation and Jaboulay tunica plication. Multiple studies have shown that both are effective techniques for fixation with limited evidence favoring either in acute torsion.

Sutured fixation may be performed using either absorbable or non-absorbable sutures, with 3 point fixation sites being preferred. There are concerns regarding potential complications arising from suture fixation (and required breach of the tunica albuginea) like infarction and abscess formation, however this is not supported by data.

The Jaboulay procedure was developed later as a non-suture fixation method that avoids trans-parenchymal sutures and instead utilizes eversion, loose plication, and adhesion formation. this technique is criticized for potential security inadequacy.

Overall, there is considerable variation in surgical practice for testicular fixation for testicular torsion, with no significant difference in effectiveness between sutured and Jaboulay fixation in emergency re-presentations, post-operative complications, or returns to operation.

== History ==
The first attempts at surgical correction of cryptorchidism began in the early 1800s. Before this, inguinal testis were managed with the use of truss or castration, if at all.

The theory of orchiopexy is attributed to the observations of Baron Albrecht von Haller and John Hunter in the 1700s, who began to elucidate the anatomy and mechanism of testicular descent.

The first recorded attempt for surgical correction of an undescended testis was performed by James Adams in the London Hospital in 1871, although there are reports of attempts by several German doctors (J. F. Rosenmerkel in 1820 and M.J. von Chelius in 1837). The patient died due to infectious complications of the procedure.

Thomas Annandale completed the first successful orchiopexy in 1887 on a three-year-old boy. He discussed the care of this patient in The British Medical Journal, crediting Thomas Curling (who had worked with James Adams) with the idea of anchoring the testis to the bottom of the scrotum. Notably, Annandale was a close acquaintance of Joseph Lister, and practiced antiseptic techniques that had been absent from previous attempts by other physicians. The postoperative course was reported to be "satisfactory in every way".

Max Schüller, Arthur Dean Bevan, and John K. Lattimer further contributed to the current techniques for orchiopexy between the late 1800s and early 1900s, with the steps for standard orchiopexy being established before the 1960s. At this point, the standard orchiopexy applied to most undescended testes had a high success rate ranging from 89% to 92%- Attention was then turned to the treatment of high undescended testes, which the standard orchiopexy did not adequately treat.

In 1979, Jones and Bagley suggested a high inguinal incision for high canalicular or intra-abdominal testes. Fowler and Stephens devised a means to preserve the blood supply of high undescended testes through collateral circulation. Their technique was modified into a two-staged operation. Later, one-stage laparoscopic orchiopexy was reported first to reveal the location of non-palpable testes and then as a therapeutic treatment.
