= Genital branch of genitofemoral nerve =

Nerve in the abdomen

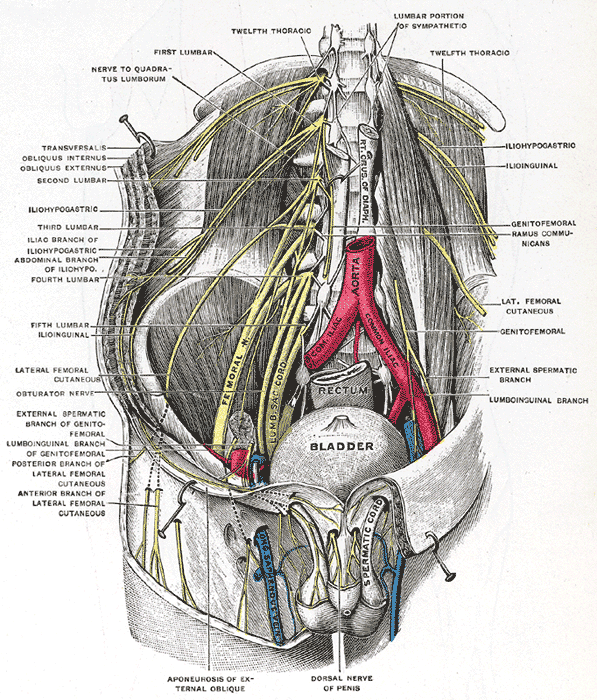
- Deep and superficial dissection of the lumbar plexus (external spermatic branch of genitofemoral labeled at bottom right)

Details
- From: Genitofemoral nerve
- Innervates: Cremaster and dartos muscle

Identifiers
- Latin: ramus genitalis nervi genitofemoralis
- TA98: A14.2.07.009
- TA2: 6530
- FMA: 20560

The genital branch of the genitofemoral nerve, also known as the external spermatic nerve in males, is a nerve in the abdomen that arises from the genitofemoral nerve. The genital branch supplies the cremaster muscle and anterior scrotal skin in males, and the skin of the mons pubis and labia majora in females.

== Structure ==
The genital branch of the genitofemoral nerve arises from the ventral primary divisions of L1-L2 spinal nerve roots. It passes outward on the psoas major muscle, and pierces the fascia transversalis, or passes through the deep inguinal ring. It then descends within the spermatic cord. In males, it passes through to the scrotum, where it supplies the cremaster, dartos muscle and gives a few filaments to the skin of the scrotum. In females, it accompanies the round ligament of the uterus, where it terminates as the nerve supplying the skin of the labia majora and mons pubis.

== Function ==
The genital branch of the genitofemoral nerve is responsible for the motor portion of the cremasteric reflex, which describes contraction of the cremasteric muscle when the skin of the superior medial part of the thigh is touched.
