= Athletic pubalgia =

Medical condition of the pubic joint

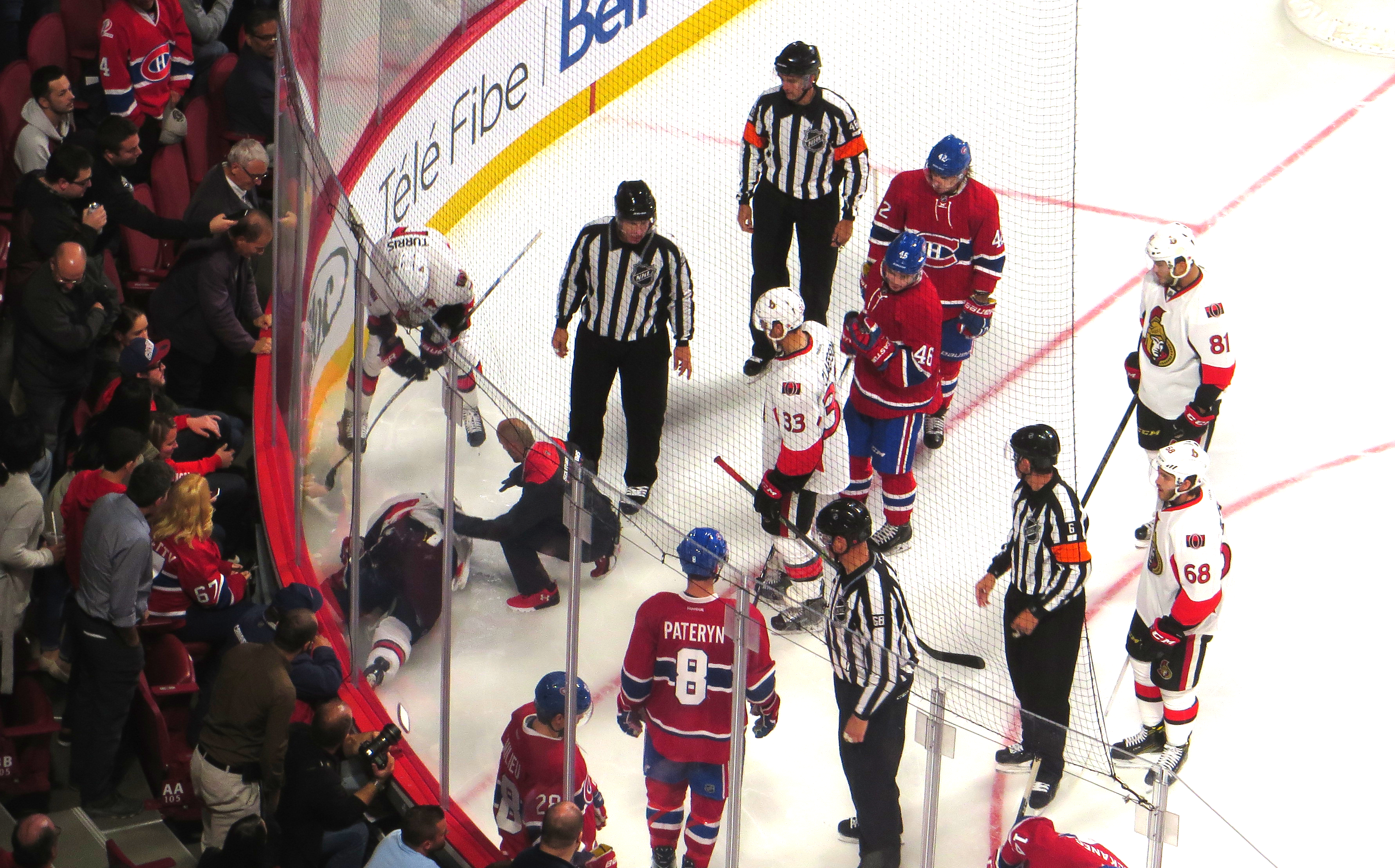
- Ice Hockey Injury
- Specialty: Sports medicine

Athletic pubalgia is a medical symptom describing pain in the pubic area, occurring with conditions such as sports hernia, inguinal disruption, pubic overload, PLAC injury, core injury, hockey hernia, hockey groin, or groin disruption, and nerve entrapment syndromes. These conditions occur most in professional athletes, in sports such as football, ice hockey and rugby.

It is a symptom characterised by chronic groin pain in athletes and a dilated superficial ring of the inguinal canal.

== Presentation ==
Symptoms include pain during sports movements, particularly hip extension, and twisting and turning. This pain usually radiates to the adductor muscle region and even the testicles, although it is often difficult for the patient to pinpoint the exact location.

Following sporting activity the person with athletic pubalgia will be stiff and sore. The day after a match, getting out of bed or a car will be difficult. Any exertion that increases intra-abdominal pressure, such as coughing, sneezing, or sporting activity can cause pain. In the early stages, the person may be able to continue playing their sport, but the problem usually gets progressively worse.

As pain in the groin and pelvis can be referred from a number of problems, including injuries to the lumbar spine, the hip joint, the sacro-iliac joint, the abdomen, and the genito-urinary system, diagnosis of athletic pubalgia requires skillful differentiation and pubic examination in certain cases where there is intense groin pain.

== Diagnosis ==
The diagnosis is based on the patient's history, clinical signs, and, increasingly, an MRI exam. Symptoms can often be reproduced by maneuvers such as performing sit-ups or crunches. Pain can also be elicited with the patient in a "frog position", in which the patient is supine with knees bent and heels together.

The exact lesion may differ, but common pathologic findings at operation are:

- torn external oblique aponeurosis
- tear in the conjoint tendon
- conjoint tendon torn from pubic tubercle
- dehiscence between conjoined tendon and inguinal ligament
- tear in the fascia transversalis
- abnormal insertion of the rectus abdominis muscle
- tear of the abdominal internal oblique muscle from the pubic tubercle
- entrapment of the ilioinguinal nerve or genitofemoral nerve

Several of these lesions may occur simultaneously. Also, many athletes have concomitant weakness or tearing of the adductor muscles or labral tears of the hip. When the adductor muscles are tight post injury, that can be enough to trigger symptoms.

== Treatment ==
Conservative therapies (gentle stretching and a short period of rest) may temporarily alleviate the pain, but definitive treatment consists of surgical repair followed by a structured rehabilitation. The first conservative treatment option should be to restore normal motion after the adductor has begun to heal (usually 6–8 weeks post injury). Sleeping in a prone position with the hip on the affected side flexed and externally rotated can be a cure in some individuals.

Early rehabilitation for sports hernias often emphasises targeted strengthening around the symptomatic area. This approach typically involves exercises designed to engage and challenge the gluteal muscles and posterior chain. The goal is to build supporting strength, which may contribute to improved stability and function during recovery.

== Incidence ==
The exact incidence of these entities is unknown: some believe it is the most common cause of chronic groin pain in athletes, while others argue that it is only rare.

== See also ==
- Sports medicine
- Sports injury
