= Cremasteric fascia =

Details

Identifiers
- Latin: fascia cremasterica
- TA98: A09.3.04.004
- TA2: 3618
- FMA: 74054 74054, 74054

The cremasteric fascia is a fascia in the scrotum. As the cremaster descends, it forms a series of loops which differ in thickness and length in different subjects. At the upper part of the cord the loops are short, but they become in succession longer and longer, the longest reaching down as low as the testis, where a few are inserted into the tunica vaginalis. These loops are united together by areolar tissue, and form a thin covering over the cord and testis, the cremasteric fascia.

The cremasteric fascia lies between the more superficial external spermatic fascia and the deeper internal spermatic fascia. It is a continuation of the aponeurosis of the abdominal internal oblique muscle.
