= Malgaigne's bulge =

Malgaigne's bulges are elongated bulges especially visible in the flank region while straining. It is common in men with poor musculature of the abdomen. This entity may be confused with inguinal hernia, although those with Malgaigne's bulges are prone to develop direct inguinal hernia. The bulges were named after Joseph Francois Malgaigne, who was a Professor of surgery in Paris, France.
