= Inguinal canal =

Human abdominal anatomy

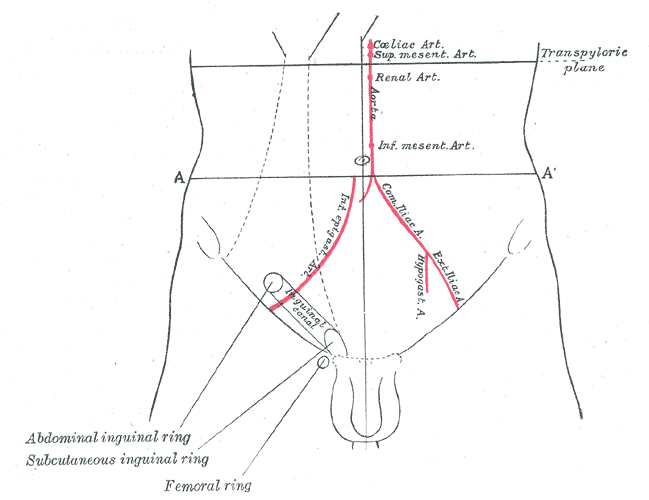
- Front of abdomen, showing surface markings for arteries and inguinal canal. (Inguinal canal is tube at lower left.)

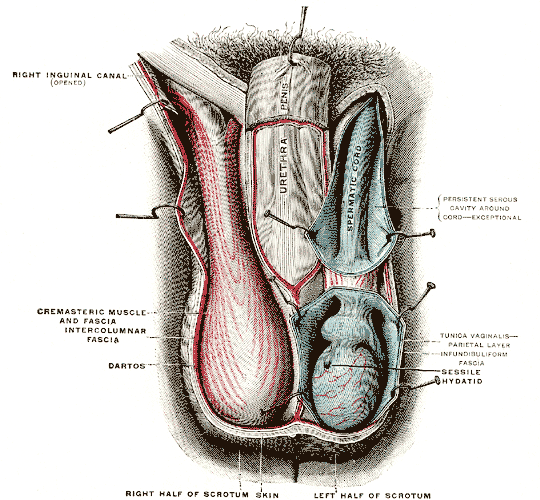
- The scrotum. On the left side (image right side), the cavity of the tunica vaginalis has been opened; on the right side (image left side), only the layers superficial to the cremaster have been removed. (Right inguinal canal visible at upper left.)

Details

Identifiers
- Latin: canalis inguinalis
- MeSH: D007264
- TA98: A04.5.01.026
- TA2: 2381
- FMA: 19928

The inguinal canal, or abdominal ring, is a passage in the anterior abdominal wall on each side of the body (one on each side of the midline), which in males, convey the spermatic cords and in females, the round ligament of the uterus. The inguinal canals are larger and more prominent in males.

== Structure ==
The inguinal canals are situated just above the medial half of the inguinal ligament. The canals are approximately 4 to 6 cm long, angled anteroinferiorly and medially. In males, its diameter is normally 2 cm (±1 cm) at the deep inguinal ring. (Note: The diameter has been estimated to be ±2.2cm ±1.08cm in Africans, and 2.1 cm ±0.41cm in Europeans.)

A first-order approximation is to visualize each canal as a cylinder.

=== Walls ===
To help define the boundaries, these canals are often further approximated as boxes with six sides. Not including the two rings, the remaining four sides are usually called the "anterior wall", "inferior wall ("floor")", "superior wall ("roof")", and "posterior wall". These consist of the following:

	superior wall (roof): Medial crus of aponeurosis of external oblique Musculoaponeurotic arches of internal oblique and transverse abdominal Transversalis fascia conjoint tendon	
anterior wall: aponeurosis of external oblique fleshy part of internal oblique (lateral third of canal only) superficial inguinal ring (medial third of canal only)	(inguinal canal)	posterior wall: transversalis fascia conjoint tendon (Inguinal falx, reflected part of inguinal ligament, medial third of canal only) deep inguinal ring (lateral third of canal only)
	inferior wall (floor): inguinal ligament lacunar ligament (medial third of canal only) iliopubic tract (lateral third of canal only)	

=== Deep inguinal ring ===
The deep inguinal ring (internal or deep abdominal ring, abdominal inguinal ring, internal inguinal ring, annulus abdominalis) is the entrance to the inguinal canal.

==== Location ====
The surface marking of the deep inguinal ring is classically described as at the midpoint of the inguinal ligament which is 0.5 inch above the inguinal ligament.

However, the surface anatomy of the point is disputed. In a recent study, it was found to be in a region between the mid-inguinal point (situated midway between the anterior superior iliac spine and the pubic symphysis) and the midpoint of the inguinal ligament (i.e. midway between the anterior superior iliac spine and the pubic tubercle). Traditionally, either one of these two sites was claimed as its location. However, this claim is based upon the study's dissection of 52 cadavers, and may not reflect the live in vivo anatomy.

Some sources state that it is at the layer of the transversalis fascia.

==== Description ====
The deep inguinal ring is an opening in the transversalis fascia. It is of an oval form, the long axis of the oval being vertical; it varies in size in different subjects, and is much larger in the male than in the female. It is bounded, above and laterally, by the arched lower margin of the transversalis fascia; below and medially, by the inferior epigastric vessels. It transmits the spermatic cord in the male and the round ligament of the uterus in the female.

From its circumference, a thin funnel-shaped membrane, the infundibuliform fascia, is continued around the cord and testis, enclosing them in a distinct covering.

=== Superficial inguinal ring ===
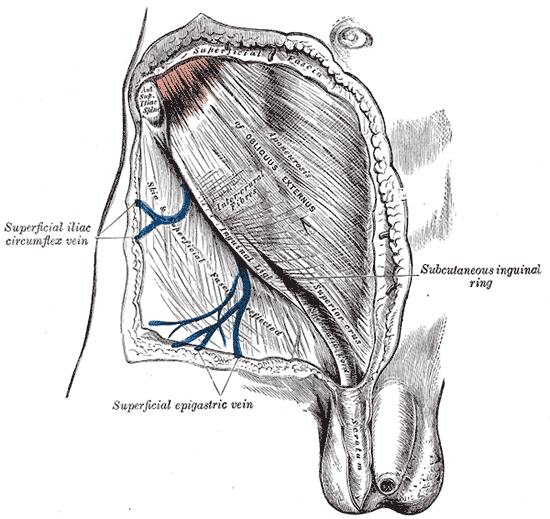
The superficial inguinal ring

The superficial inguinal ring (subcutaneous inguinal ring or external inguinal ring) is an anatomical structure in the anterior wall of the mammalian abdomen. It is a triangular opening that forms the exit of the inguinal canal, which houses the ilioinguinal nerve, the genital branch of the genitofemoral nerve, and the spermatic cord (in men) or the round ligament (in women). At the other end of the canal, the deep inguinal ring forms the entrance.

It is found within the aponeurosis of the external oblique, immediately above the pubic crest, 1 centimeter above and superolateral to the pubic tubercle. It has the following boundaries—medial crura by pubic crest, lateral crura by pubic tubercle and inferiorly by inguinal ligament.

=== Contents ===
The structures which pass through the canals differ between males and females:

- in males: the spermatic cord and its coverings, and the ilioinguinal nerve.
- in females: the round ligament of the uterus, and the ilioinguinal nerve.

The classic description of the contents of the spermatic cords in the male are:

3 arteries: artery to vas deferens (or ductus deferens), testicular artery, cremasteric artery;

3 fascial layers: external spermatic, cremasteric, and internal spermatic fascia;

3 other structures: pampiniform plexus, vas deferens (ductus deferens), testicular lymphatics;

3 nerves: genital branch of the genitofemoral nerve (L1/2), sympathetic and visceral afferent fibres, ilioinguinal nerve (N.B. outside spermatic cord but travels next to it)

Note that the ilioinguinal nerve passes through the superficial ring to descend into the scrotum, but does not formally run through the canal.

=== Development ===
==== In males ====
During development, each testicle descends from the starting point on the posterior abdominal wall (para-aortically) from the labioscrotal swellings near the kidneys, down the abdomen, and through the inguinal canals to reach the scrotum. This way, each testicle descends through the abdominal wall into the scrotum behind the processus vaginalis (which later obliterates).

== Clinical significance ==
Abdominal contents (potentially including intestine) can be abnormally displaced from the abdominal cavity. Where these contents exit through the inguinal canal, having passed through the deep inguinal ring, the condition is known as an indirect or oblique inguinal hernia. This can also cause infertility. This condition is far more common in males than in females, owing to the inguinal canal's small size in females.

A hernia that exits the abdominal cavity directly through the deep layers of the abdominal wall, thereby bypassing the inguinal canal, is known as a direct inguinal hernia.

In males with strong presentation of the cremasteric reflex, the testes can—during supine sexual activity or manual manipulation—partially or fully retract into the inguinal canal for a short period of time. In juveniles and adults with inguinal injury, retraction can be prolonged and potentially lead to overheating-related infertility.

The superficial ring is palpable under normal conditions. It becomes dilated in a condition called athletic pubalgia. Abdominal contents may protrude through the ring in inguinal hernia.

Thus lymphatic spread from a testicular tumour is to the para-aortic nodes first, and not the inguinal nodes.

== Sexuality ==
The inguinal canals can be penetrated for sexual stimulation. This practice is called muffing.

== Additional images ==
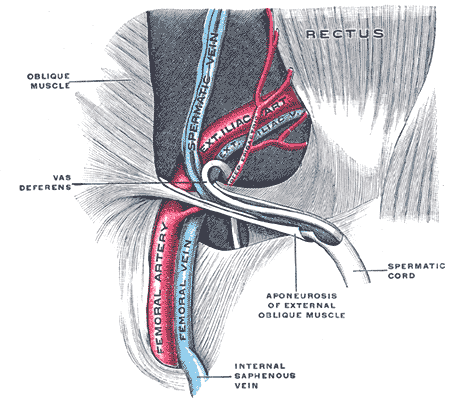
The spermatic cord in the inguinal canal

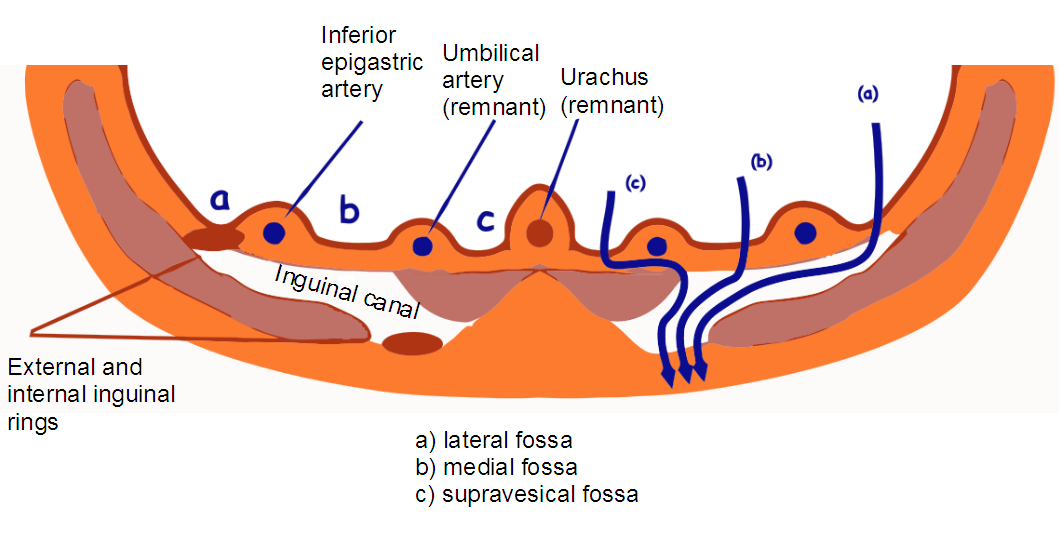
Inguinal fossae

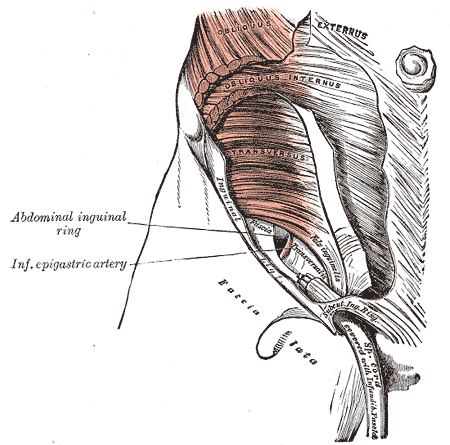
The abdominal inguinal ring

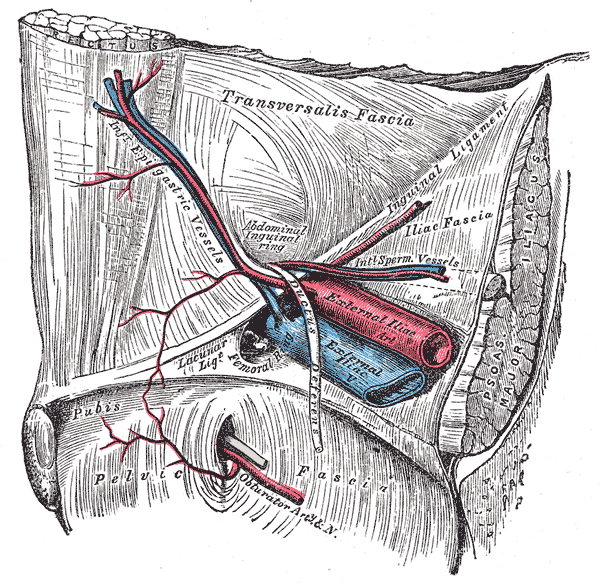
The relations of the femoral and abdominal inguinal rings, seen from within the abdomen. Right side.

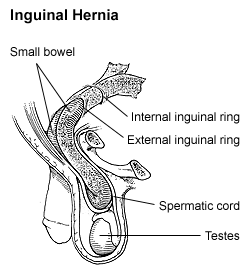
Diagram of an indirect, scrotal inguinal hernia (median view from the left)

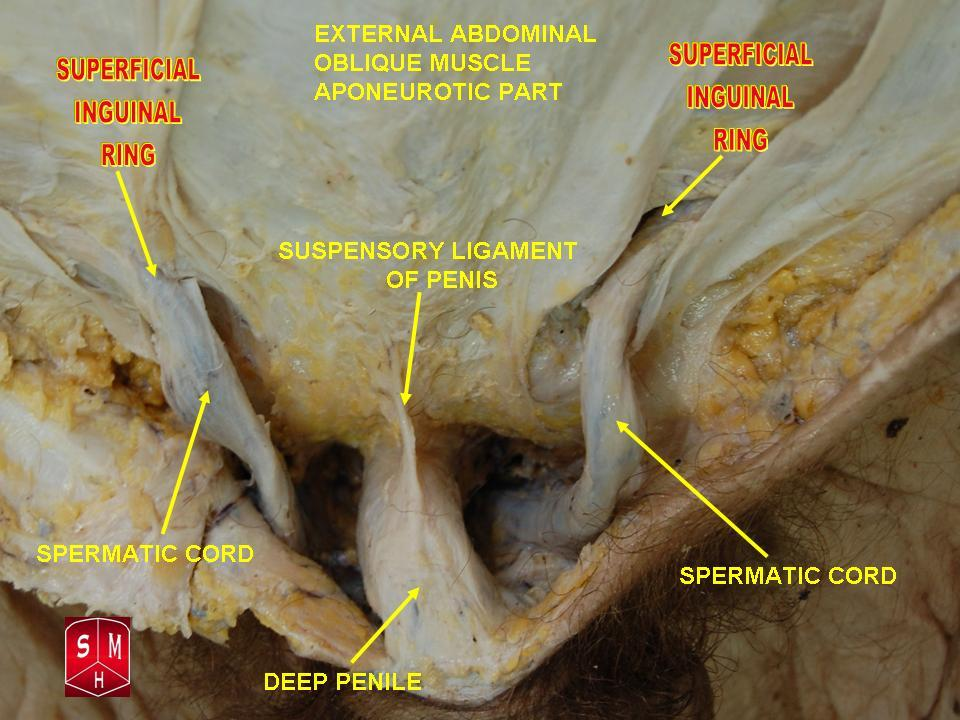
Superficial inguinal ring

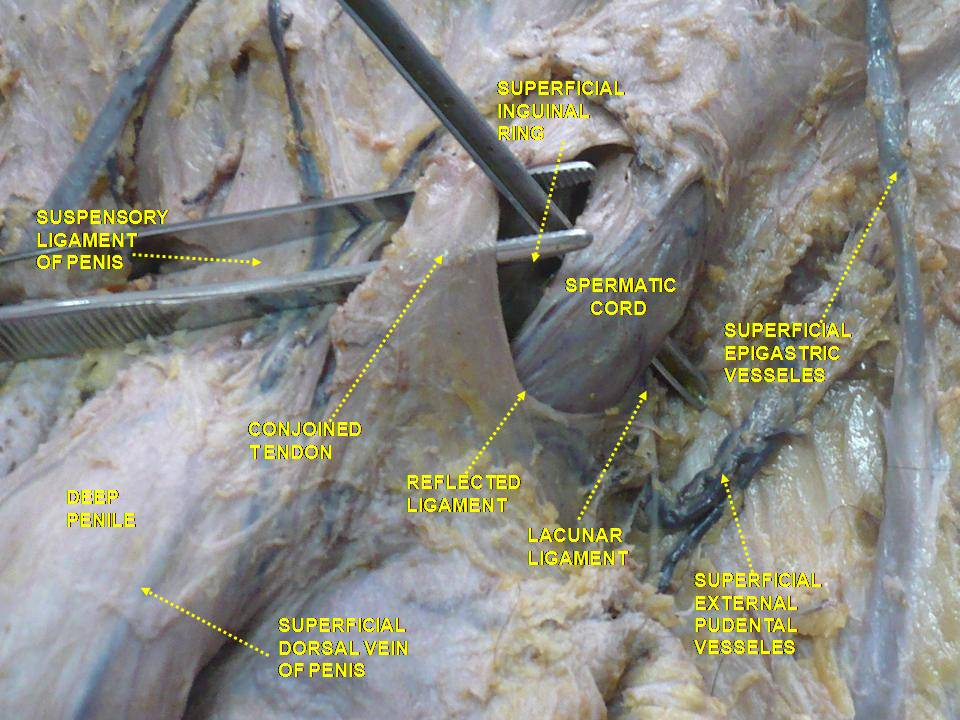
Anterior abdominal wall. Intermediate dissection. Anterior view.

== See also ==
- Superficial inguinal ring
- Inguinal hernia
- Tucking
