= Cremasteric artery =

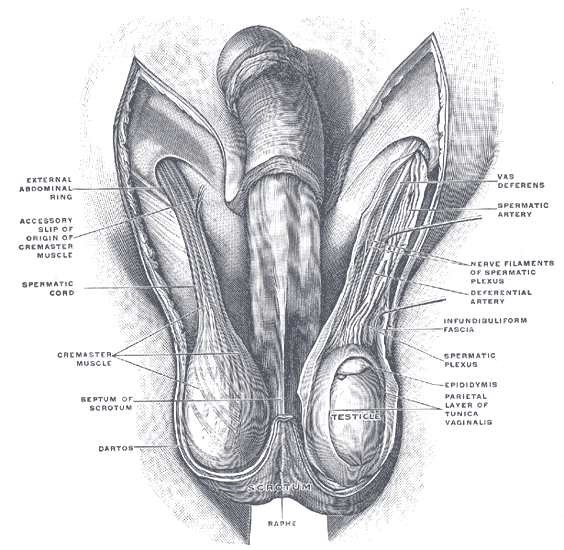
- The scrotum.

Details
- Source: Inferior epigastric artery

Identifiers
- Latin: arteria cremasterica
- TA98: A12.2.16.007M
- TA2: 4362
- FMA: 70192

The cremasteric artery (external spermatic artery) is a branch of the inferior epigastric artery which accompanies the spermatic cord to supply the cremaster muscle as well as other coverings of the spermatic cord in the male (whereas in the female, the cremasteric artery is very small and accompanies the round ligament).

== Anatomy ==
=== Course ===
The cremasteric artery enters the inguinal canal at the deep inguinal ring to traverse the length of the spermatic cord alongside the testicular artery. Within the spermatic cord, the cremasteric artery travels within the external spermatic fascia, but outside the internal spermatic fascia.

=== Anastomoses ===
The cremasteric artery participates in the formation of a rich arterial anastomotic network within the scrotum at the tail of the epidydimis with the testicular artery, epididymal artery, and the artery to the ductus deferens.
