= Interfoveolar ligament =

Band of fibers in front of the inferior epigastric artery in the abdomen

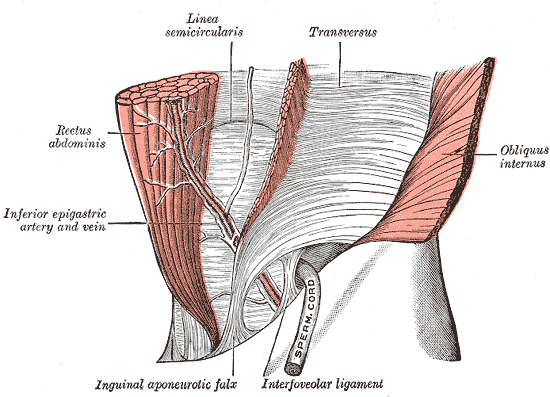
- The interfoveolar ligament, seen from in front. (Interfoveolar ligament labeled at bottom center.)

Details
- From: Transversalis fascia
- To: Lacunar ligament

Identifiers
- Latin: ligamentum interfoveolare
- TA98: A04.5.02.012
- TA2: 2391
- FMA: 18095

Lateral to the conjoint tendon, previously known as the inguinal aponeurotic falx, there is a ligamentous band originating from the lower margin of the transversalis fascia and extending down in front of the inferior epigastric artery to the superior ramus of the pubis; it is termed the interfoveolar ligament of Hesselbach and sometimes contains a few muscular fibers.

It is named for Franz Kaspar Hesselbach.
