= Inguinal triangle =

Region of the abdominal wall in humans

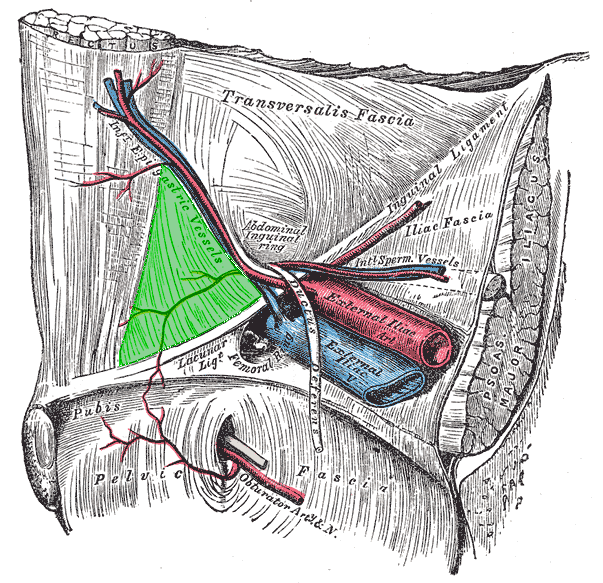
- Internal (from posterior to anterior) view of right inguinal area of the male pelvis. Inguinal triangle is labeled in green. The three surrounding structures: inferior epigastric vessels: Run from upper left to center. inguinal ligament: Runs from upper right to bottom left. rectus abdominis muscle: Runs from upper left to bottom left, labeled rectus at upper left.

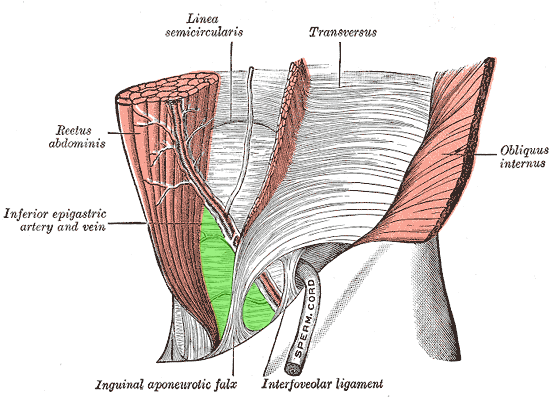
- External view. Inguinal triangle is labeled in green. Borders: inferior epigastric artery and vein: labeled at center left, and run from upper right to bottom center. inguinal ligament: not labeled on diagram, but runs a similar path to the inguinal aponeurotic falx, labeled at bottom. rectus abdominis muscle: runs from upper left to bottom left.

Details

Identifiers
- Latin: trigonum inguinale
- TA98: A10.1.02.433
- TA2: 3795
- FMA: 256506

In human anatomy, the inguinal triangle is a region of the abdominal wall. It is also known by the eponym Hesselbach's triangle.

== Structure ==
It is defined by the following structures:

- Medial border: Lateral margin of the rectus sheath.
- Superolateral border: Inferior epigastric vessels.
- Inferior border: Inguinal ligament.

== Clinical significance ==
The inguinal triangle contains a depression referred to as the medial inguinal fossa, through which direct inguinal hernias protrude through the abdominal wall.

== History ==
The inguinal triangle is also known as Hesselbach's triangle, after Franz Kaspar Hesselbach.

== See also ==
- Terms for anatomical location
- Inguinal hernia surgery
