= Iliopubic tract =

Tissue band in the lower abdomen

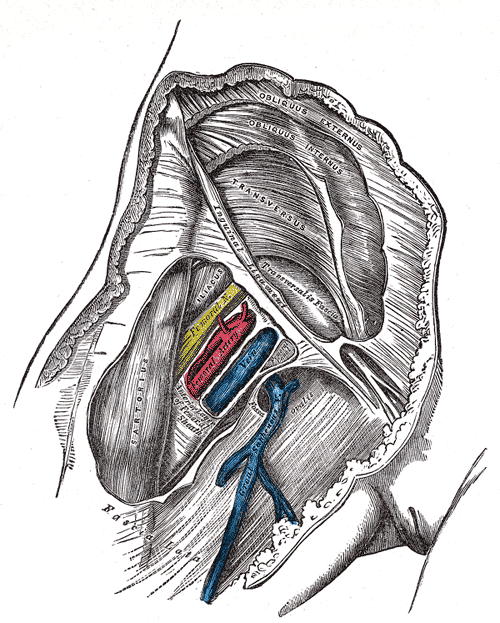
- Femoral sheath laid open to show its three compartments.

Details

Identifiers
- Latin: tractus iliopubicus
- TA98: A04.5.02.013
- TA2: 2392
- FMA: 18094

The iliopubic tract is a thickened band of fibers curving over the external iliac vessels, at the spot where they become femoral, on the abdominal side of the inguinal ligaments and loosely connected with it. It is apparently a thickening of the transversalis fascia joined laterally to the iliac crest, and arching across the front of the femoral sheath to be inserted by a broad attachment into the pubic tubercle and pectineal line, behind the conjoint tendon. In some subjects this structure is not very prominently marked, and not infrequently it is altogether wanting. It can be of clinical significance in hernia repair.
