= External spermatic fascia =

Thin membrane covering the spermatic cord and testis

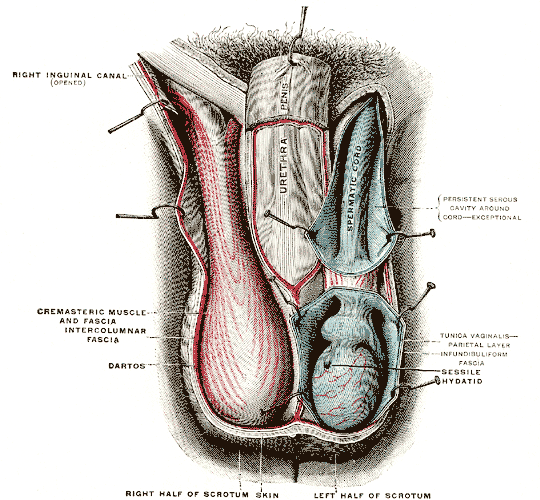
- The scrotum. On the left side the cavity of the tunica vaginalis has been opened; on the right side only the layers superficial to the cremaster have been removed.

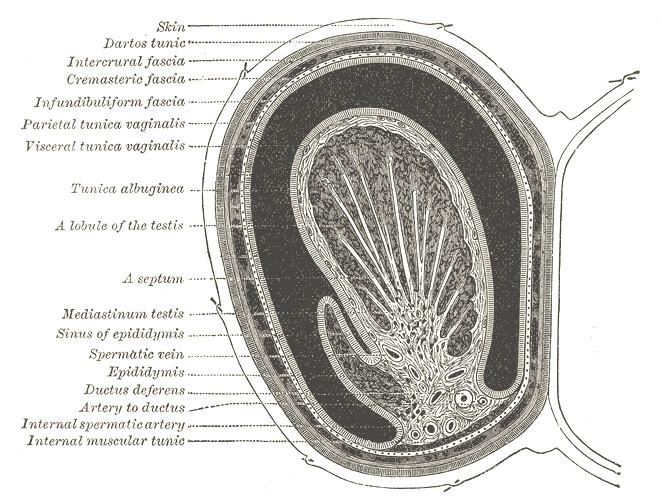
- Transverse section through the left side of the scrotum and the left testis. The sac of the tunica vaginalis is represented in a distended condition.

Details

Identifiers
- Latin: fascia spermatica externa

The external spermatic fascia (intercrural or intercolumnar fascia) is a thin membrane, prolonged downward around the surface of the spermatic cord and testis. It is separated from the dartos tunic by loose areolar tissue. It is occasionally referred to as 'Le Fascia de Webster' after an anatomist who once described it.

== Structure ==
The external spermatic fascia is derived from the aponeurosis of the abdominal external oblique muscle. It is acquired by the spermatic cord at the superficial inguinal ring.
