= Spermatic cord =

Structure in the human male reproductive system

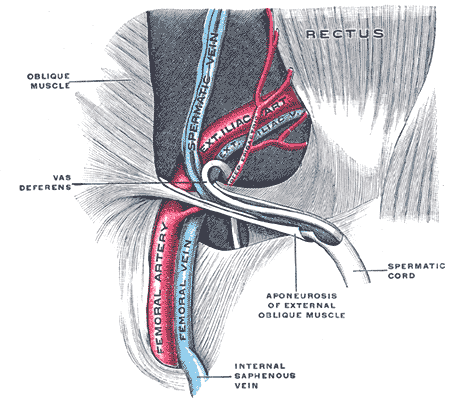
- The spermatic cord in the inguinal canal (label for spermatic cord in lower right)

Details
- Artery: Testicular artery
- Vein: Pampiniform plexus

Identifiers
- Latin: funiculus spermaticus
- MeSH: D013085
- TA98: A09.3.04.001
- TA2: 3615
- FMA: 19937

The spermatic cord is the cord-like structure in males formed by the vas deferens (ductus deferens) and surrounding tissue that runs from the deep inguinal ring down to each testicle. Its serosal covering, the tunica vaginalis, is an extension of the peritoneum that passes through the transversalis fascia. Each testicle develops in the lower thoracic and upper lumbar region and migrates into the scrotum. During its descent it carries along with it the vas deferens, its vessels, nerves etc. There is one on each side.

== Structure ==
The spermatic cord is ensheathed in three layers of tissue:

- external spermatic fascia, an extension of the innominate fascia that overlies the aponeurosis of the external oblique muscle.
- cremasteric muscle and fascia, formed from a continuation of the internal oblique muscle and its fascia.
- internal spermatic fascia, continuous with the transversalis fascia.

The normal diameter of the spermatic cord is about 16 mm (range 11 to 22 mm). It is located behind the tunica vaginalis.

=== Contents ===
==== Blood vessels ====
- Testicular artery
- Artery to the ductus deferens
- Cremasteric artery

==== Nerves ====
- Nerve to cremaster (genital branch of the genitofemoral nerve).
- Testicular nerves (sympathetic nerves).

The ilioinguinal nerve is not actually located inside the spermatic cord, but runs outside it in the inguinal canal.

==== Other contents ====
- Vas deferens
- Pampiniform plexus
- Lymphatic vessels

The tunica vaginalis is located in front of the spermatic cord, outside it.

== Clinical significance ==
The spermatic cord is sensitive to torsion, in which the testicle rotates within its sac and blocks its own blood supply. Testicular torsion may result in irreversible damage to the testicle within hours. A collection of serous fluid in the spermatic cord is named 'funiculocele'.

The contents of the abdominal cavity may protrude into the inguinal canal, producing an indirect inguinal hernia

Varicose veins of the spermatic cord are referred to as varicocele. Though often asymptomatic, about one in four people with varicocele have negatively affected fertility.

== Additional images ==
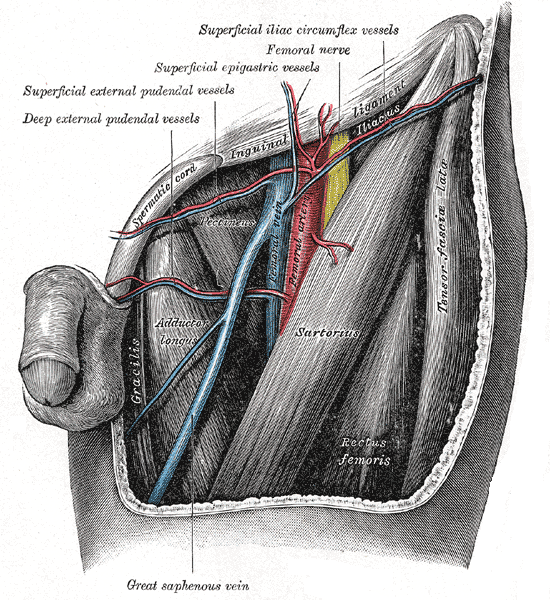
The left femoral triangle

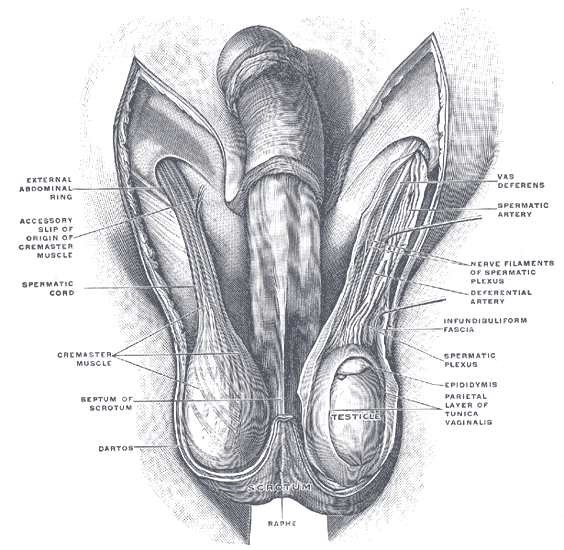
The scrotum

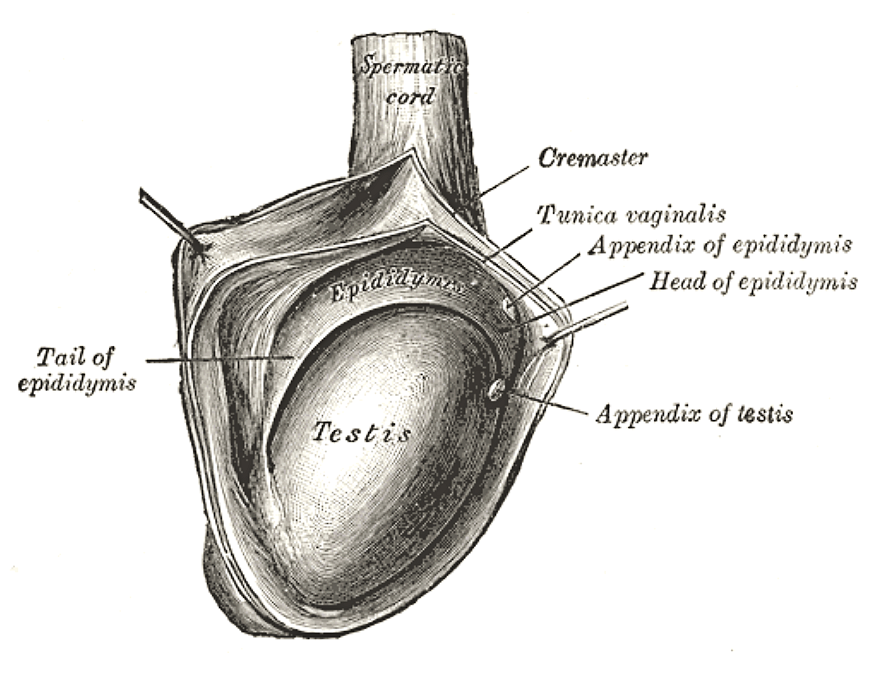
The right testis, exposed by laying open the tunica vaginalis

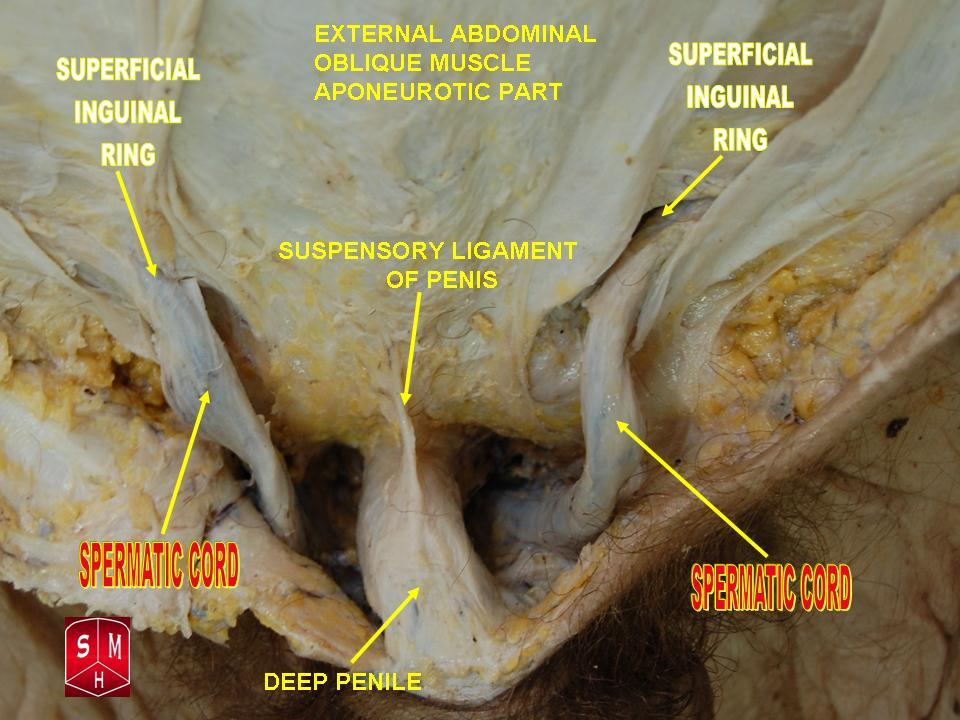
Spermatic cord

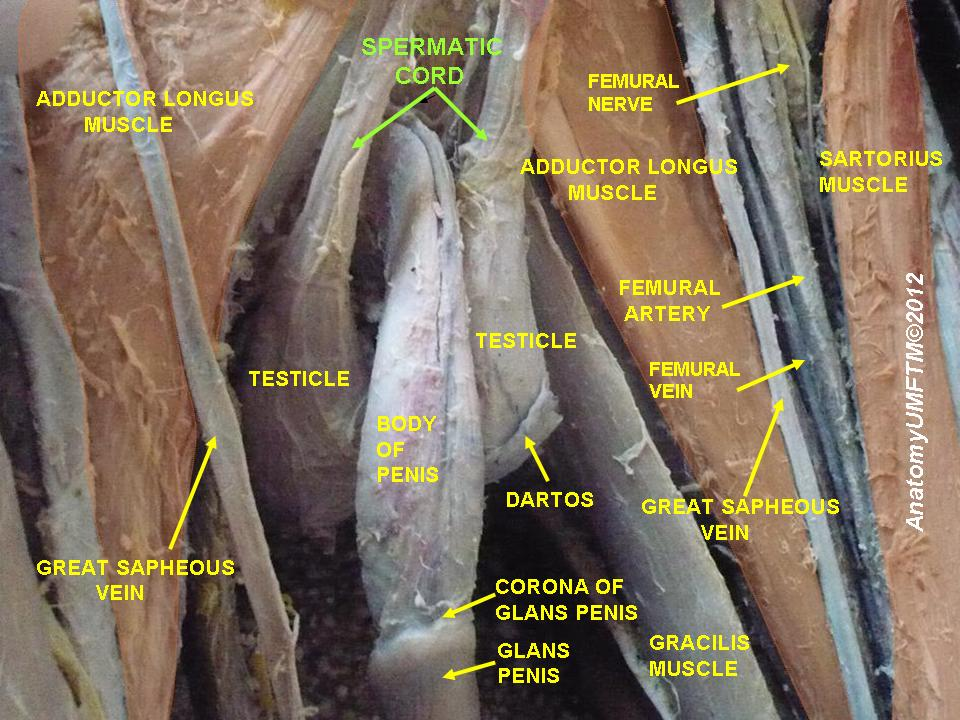
Spermatic cord

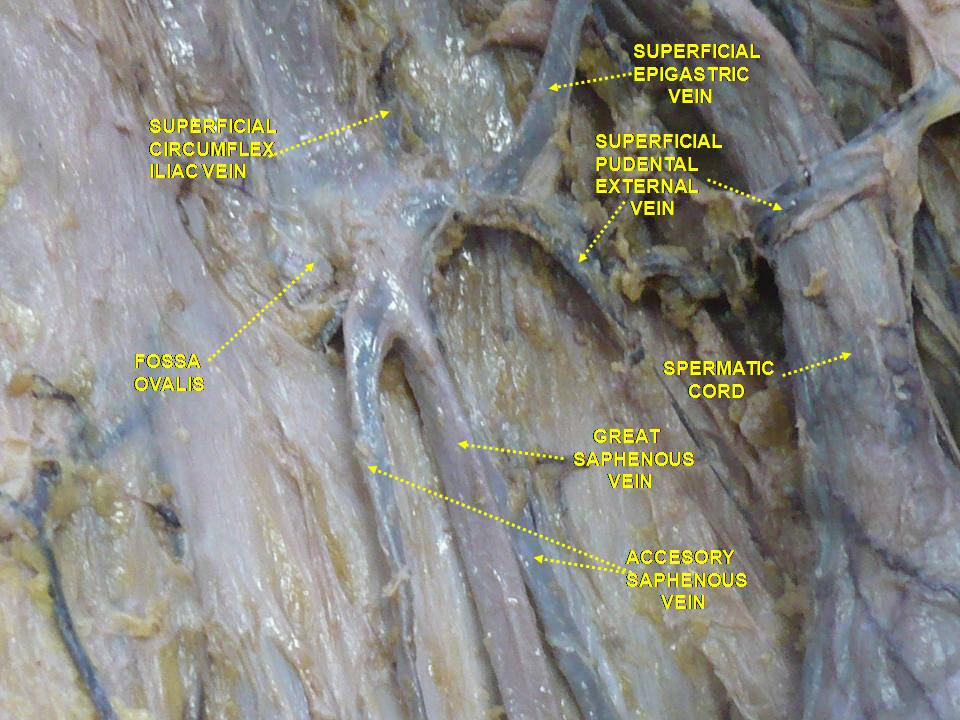
Superficial veins oflower limb. Superficial dissection. Anterior view.
