= Dartos fascia =

Layer of tissue

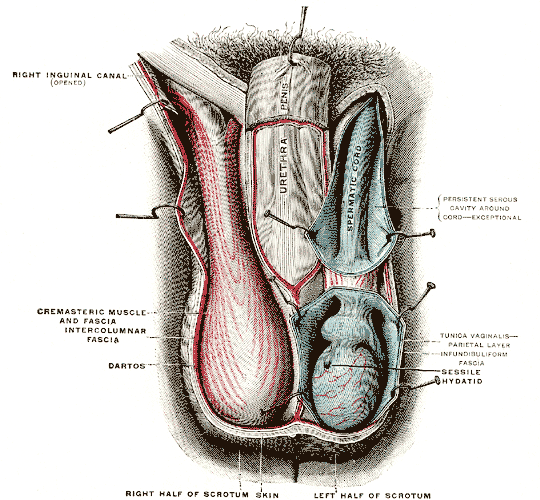
- The scrotum. (Label for dartos is at bottom left.)

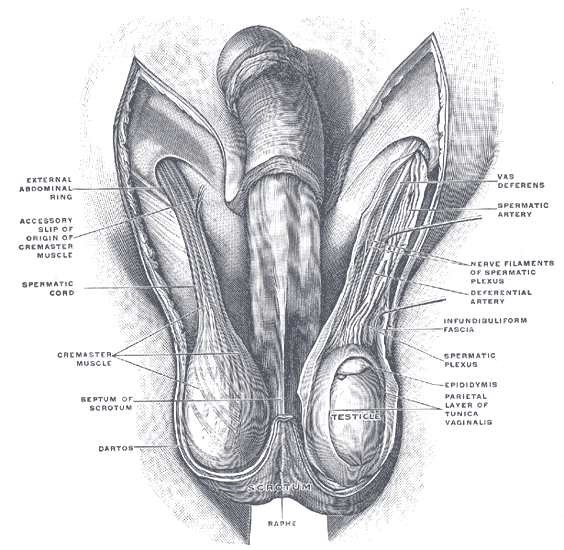
- The scrotum. (Label for dartos is at bottom left.)

Details
- Origin: Subcutaneous tissue of scrotum, superficial to superficial fascia (Colles)
- Insertion: Skin and midline raphe of scrotum
- Nerve: Genital branch of genitofemoral nerve
- Actions: Corrugates the scrotum

Identifiers
- Latin: tunica dartos
- TA98: A09.4.03.003
- TA2: 3695
- FMA: 18088

The dartos fascia, dartos tunic or simply dartos is a layer of connective tissue found in the penile shaft, foreskin and scrotum. The penile portion is referred to as the superficial fascia of penis or the subcutaneous tissue of penis, while the scrotal part is the dartos proper. In addition to being continuous with itself between the scrotum and the penis, it is also continuous with Colles' fascia of the perineum and Scarpa's fascia of the abdomen.

The dartos lies just below the skin, which places it just superficial to the external spermatic fascia in the scrotum and to Buck's fascia in the penile shaft. In the scrotum, it consists mostly of smooth muscle. The tone of this smooth muscle is responsible for the wrinkled (rugose) appearance of the scrotum. In females, the same muscle fibers are less well developed and termed dartos muliebris, lying beneath the skin of the labia majora. The dartos fascia receives innervation from postganglionic sympathetic nerve fibers arriving via the ilioinguinal nerve and the posterior scrotal nerve.

== Function ==
In the penis, the loose attachment of the dartos fascia to Buck's fascia is responsible for the high degree of mobility of the penile skin over the underlying tissue. It is also responsible for carrying the blood supply of the penile skin, a longitudinally-coursing anastomotic network of vessels that arise from the external pudendal vessels.

In the scrotum, the dartos fascia acts to regulate the temperature of the testicles, which promotes spermatogenesis. It does this by expanding or contracting to wrinkle the scrotal skin.

- Contraction reduces the surface area available for heat loss, thus reducing heat loss and warming the testicles.
- Conversely, expansion increases the surface area, promoting heat loss and thus cooling the testicles.

The dartos muscle works in conjunction with the cremaster muscle to elevate the testis but should not be confused with the cremasteric reflex.

The dartos fascia keeps the foreskin close to the glans penis throughout life. In infancy, the dartos fascia operates as a one-way check valve at the tip of the foreskin, allowing urine to pass out, but prohibiting the entry of foreign matter and pathogens.

There is an increase in elastic fibers with increasing maturity that allows the foreskin to become retractable by adulthood and glide freely back and forth.

== Related terms ==
Etymology:

Derived from the Greek δέρνω/derno (beat, flog) and/or δέρμα/derma (skin), meaning "that which is skinned or flayed", possibly due to its appearance.

Some dartos-related terms:

dartoic (dar·to·ic) (dahr-to'ik) of the nature of a dartos; having a slow, involuntary contractility like that of the dartos.

dartoid (dar·toid) (dahr'toid) resembling the dartos.

== Additional images ==
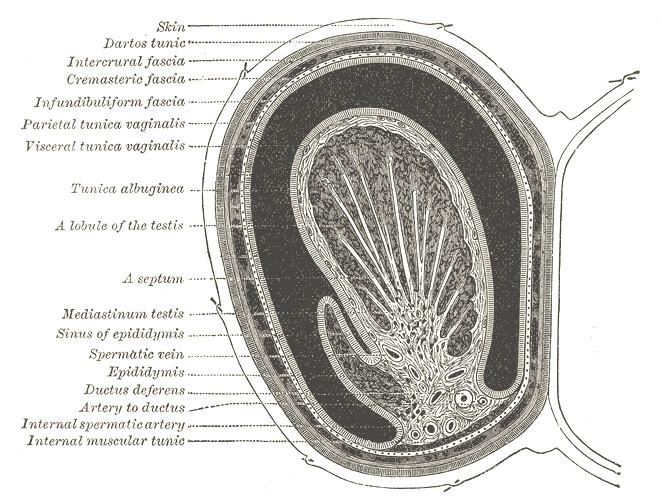
Transverse section through the left side of the scrotum and the left testis.

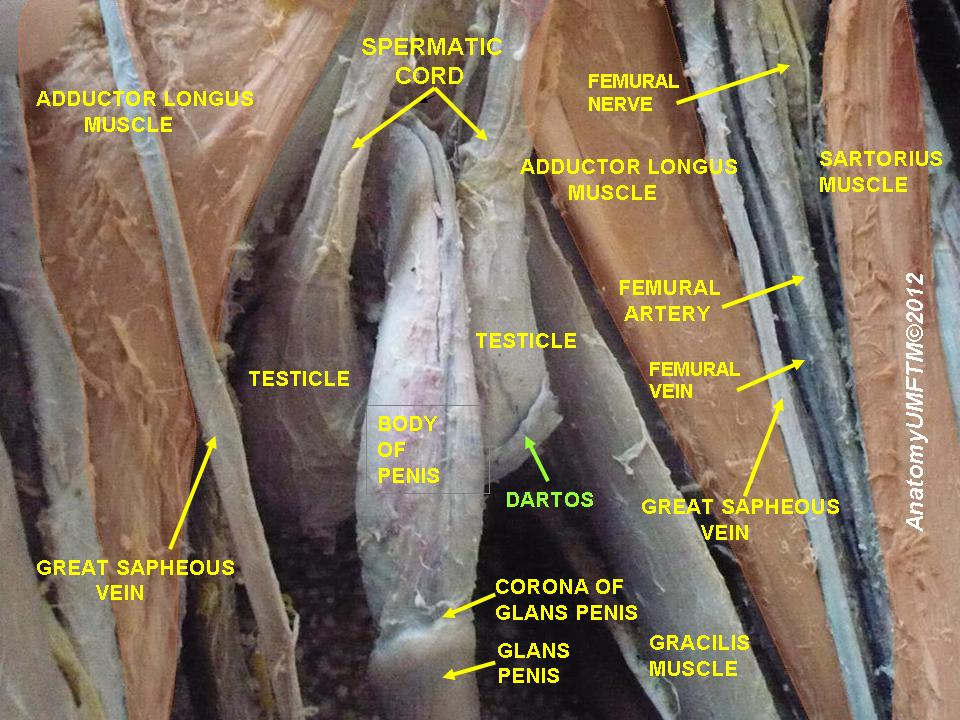
Dartos
