= Genitofemoral nerve =

Mixed branch of the lumbar plexus

- Plan of lumbar plexus. (Genitofemoral nerve visible at upper left.)

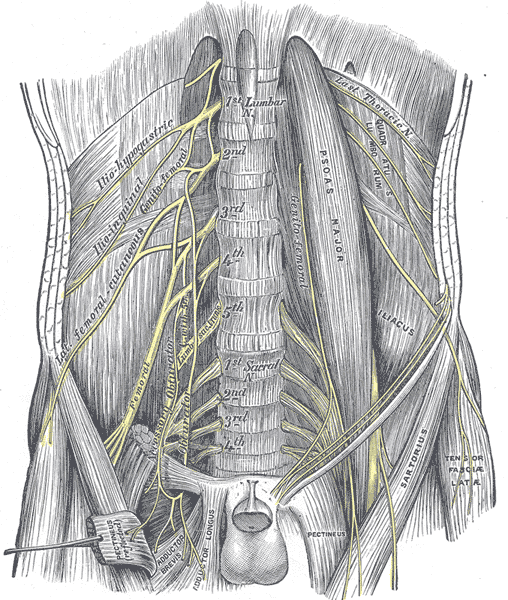
- The lumbar plexus and its branches. (Genitofemoral nerve visible at upper left.)

Details
- From: Lumbar plexus
- To: Lumboinguinal, genital branch
- Innervates: Cremaster muscle Anterior scrotum in males Mons pubis in females

Identifiers
- Latin: nervus genitofemoralis nervus genitalifemoralis
- TA98: A14.2.07.008
- TA2: 6529
- FMA: 16484

The genitofemoral nerve is a mixed branch of the lumbar plexus derived from anterior rami of lumbar nerves L1–L2. It splits into a genital branch and a femoral branch. It provides sensory innervation to the upper anterior thigh, as well as the skin of the anterior scrotum in males and mons pubis in females. It also provides motor innervation to the cremaster muscle (via its genital branch).

== Structure ==
=== Origin ===
The genitofemoral nerve is a branch of the lumbar plexus. It is derived from the anterior rami of lumbar nerves L1–L2. It coalesces within the substances of the psoas major muscle.

=== Course ===
It passes downwards, pierces the psoas major and emerges from its anterior surface. The nerve divides into two branches, the genital branch and the lumboinguinal nerve also known as the femoral branch, both of which then continue downwards and medially to the inguinal and femoral canal respectively.

=== Branches ===
==== Genital branch ====
The genital branch continues downward on the surface of the psoas major muscle, then enters the inguinal canal through the deep inguinal ring.

In men, the genital branch supplies the cremaster and scrotal skin. In women, the genital branch accompanies the round ligament of uterus, terminating in and innervating the skin of the mons pubis and labia majora.

==== Femoral branch ====
The femoral branch passes underneath the inguinal ligament, travelling through the lateral muscular compartment of the femoral sheath where it innervates skin of the upper leg. Passing through the cribriform fascia of the saphenous opening of the fascia lata of the thigh, it then supplies the skin of the upper, anterior and medial side of thigh.

=== Variation ===
The genitofemoral nerve typically pierces and passes through the psoas major muscle before bifurcating into a genital branch and a femoral branch midway along its anterior surface. In approximately 25% of cases, the genitofemoral nerve splits into these branches before it enters the psoas major or within the muscle belly of psoas major (with fibers of the psoas major separating the genital and femoral branches). Usually this variation causes the split to be occur earlier in the genitofemoral nerve, at the upper rather than mid-portion of the anterior surface of the psoas major.

=== Embryology ===
The genitofemoral nerve is formed in the midsection of the psoas muscle by the union of branches from the anterior rami of L1 and L2 nerve roots

== Function ==
The genitofemoral nerve is responsible for both the sensory (femoral branch) and motor portions (genital branch) of the cremasteric reflex, which describes contraction of the cremasteric muscle when the skin of the superior medial part of the thigh is touched.

== Additional images ==
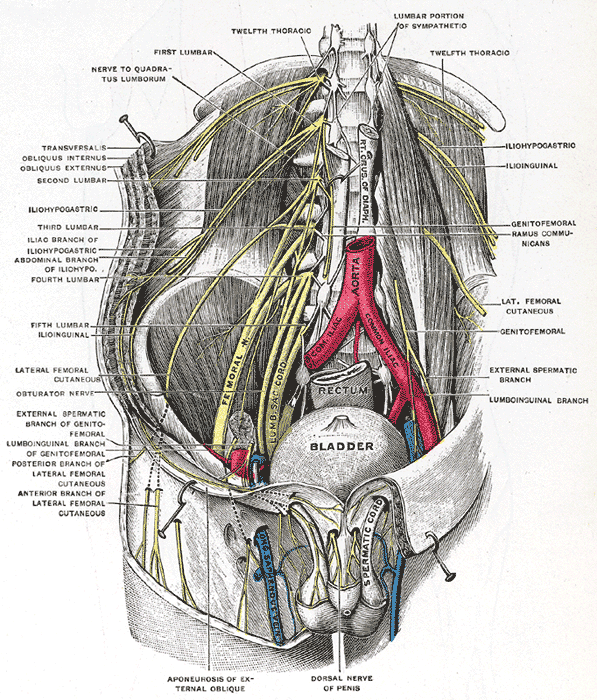
Deep and superficial dissection of the lumbar plexus.

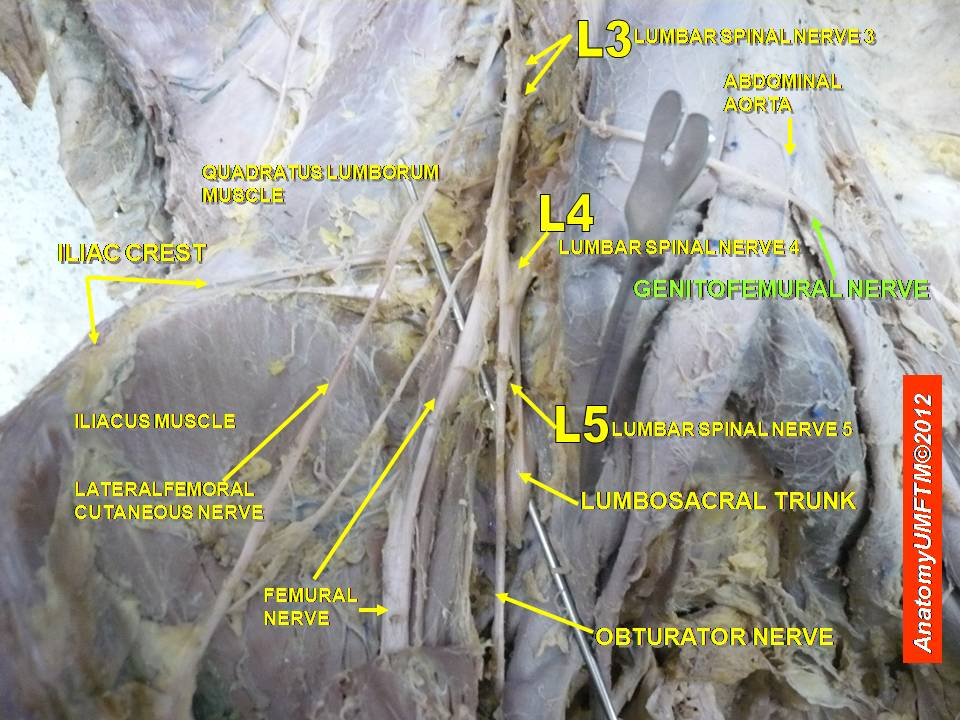
Genitofemoral nerve
