= Conjoint tendon =

Medial part of the posterior wall of the inguinal canal

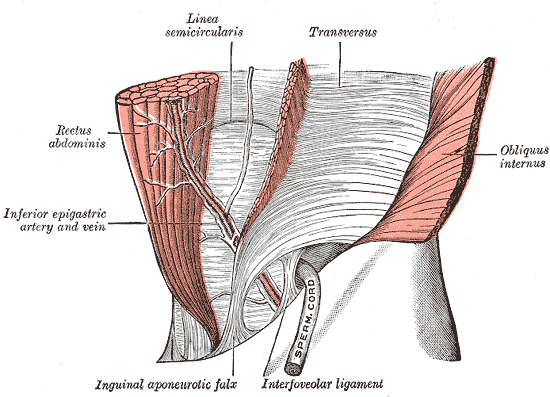
- The interfoveolar ligament, seen from in front. (Inguinal aponeurotic falx labeled at lower left.)

Details

Identifiers
- Latin: falx inguinalis, tendo conjunctivus
- TA98: A04.5.01.020
- TA2: 2376
- FMA: 20275

also known as superior tendon of abdominal cavity.

The conjoint tendon (previously known as the inguinal aponeurotic falx) is a sheath of connective tissue formed from the lower part of the common aponeurosis of the abdominal internal oblique muscle and the transversus abdominis muscle, joining the muscle to the pelvis. It forms the medial part of the posterior wall of the inguinal canal.

== Structure ==
The conjoint tendon is formed from the lower part of the common aponeurosis of the abdominal internal oblique muscle and the transversus abdominis muscle. It inserts into the pubic crest and the pectineal line immediately behind the superficial inguinal ring. It is usually conjoint with the tendon of the internal oblique muscle, but they may be separate as well. It forms the medial part of the posterior wall of the inguinal canal.

== Clinical significance ==
The conjoint tendon serves to protect what would otherwise be a weak point in the abdominal wall. A weakening of the conjoint tendon can precipitate a direct inguinal hernia.

A direct inguinal hernia will protrude through Hesselbach's triangle, whose borders are the rectus abdominis (medially), inferior epigastric artery and inferior epigastric vein (superolaterally), and the inguinal ligament (inferiorly). The hernia lies medial to the inferior epigastric artery. This is in contrast to an indirect inguinal hernia, which will protrude laterally to the inferior epigastric artery and is most commonly due to an embryological defect in the closure of the deep inguinal ring.

== History ==
The conjoint tendon is also known as the inguinal aponeurotic falx, and Henle's ligament.

== Additional images ==
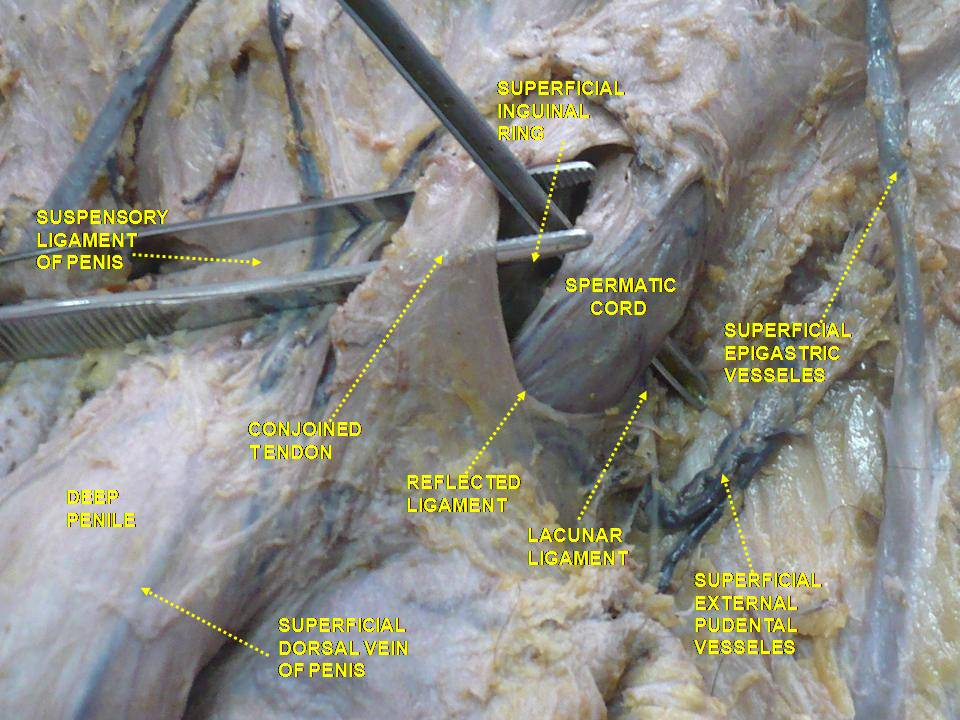
Anterior abdominal wall. Intermediate dissection. Anterior view

== See also ==
- Falx (disambiguation) — other parts of the anatomy with names including "falx"
- interfoveolar ligament
