= Transversalis fascia =

Aponeurosis between the transverse abdominal muscle and the extraperitoneal fat

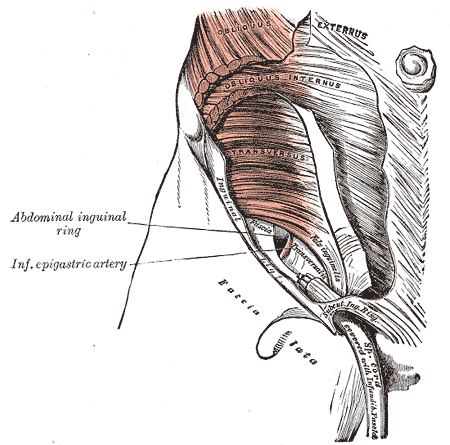
- The abdominal inguinal ring. ("Fascia transversalis" visible near center.)

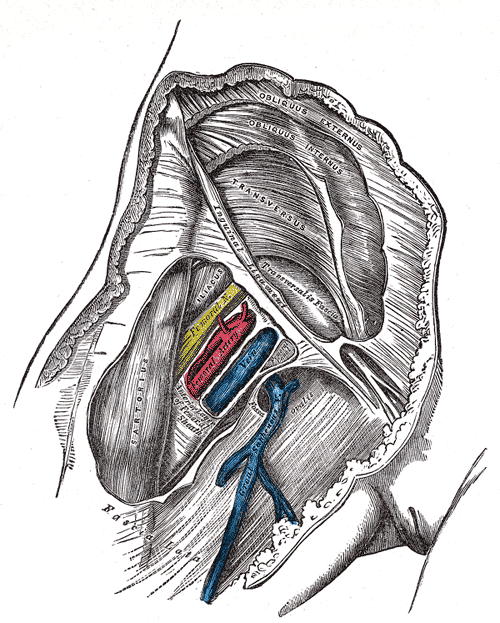
- Femoral sheath laid open to show its three compartments.

Details

Identifiers
- Latin: fascia transversalis
- TA98: A04.5.02.011
- TA2: 2389
- FMA: 12265

The transversalis fascia (also Hyrtl fascia or transverse fascia) is the fascial lining of the anterolateral abdominal wall situated between the inner surface of the transverse abdominal muscle, and the preperitoneal fascia. It is directly continuous with the iliac fascia, the internal spermatic fascia, and pelvic fascia.

== Structure ==
In the inguinal region, the transversalis fascia is thick and dense; here, it is joined by fibers of the aponeurosis of the transverse abdominal muscle. It becomes thin towards to the diaphragm, blending with the fascia covering the inferior surface of the diaphragm.

Posteriorly, it is lost in the fat which covers the posterior surfaces of the kidneys

Below, it has the following attachments: posteriorly, to the whole length of the iliac crest, between the attachments of the transverse abdominal and Iliacus; between the anterior superior iliac spine and the femoral vessels it is connected to the posterior margin of the inguinal ligament, and is there continuous with the iliac fascia.

Medial to the femoral vessels it is thin and attached to the pubis and pectineal line, behind the inguinal falx, with which it is united; it descends in front of the femoral vessels to form the anterior wall of the femoral sheath.

Beneath the inguinal ligament it is strengthened by a band of fibrous tissue, which is only loosely connected to the ligament, and is specialized as the iliopubic tract.

=== Opening ===
The spermatic cord in the male and the round ligament of the uterus in the female pass through the transversalis fascia at the deep inguinal ring, the entrance to the inguinal canal. This opening is not visible externally. In the male, the transverse fascia extends downwards as the internal spermatic fascia.

== Additional images ==
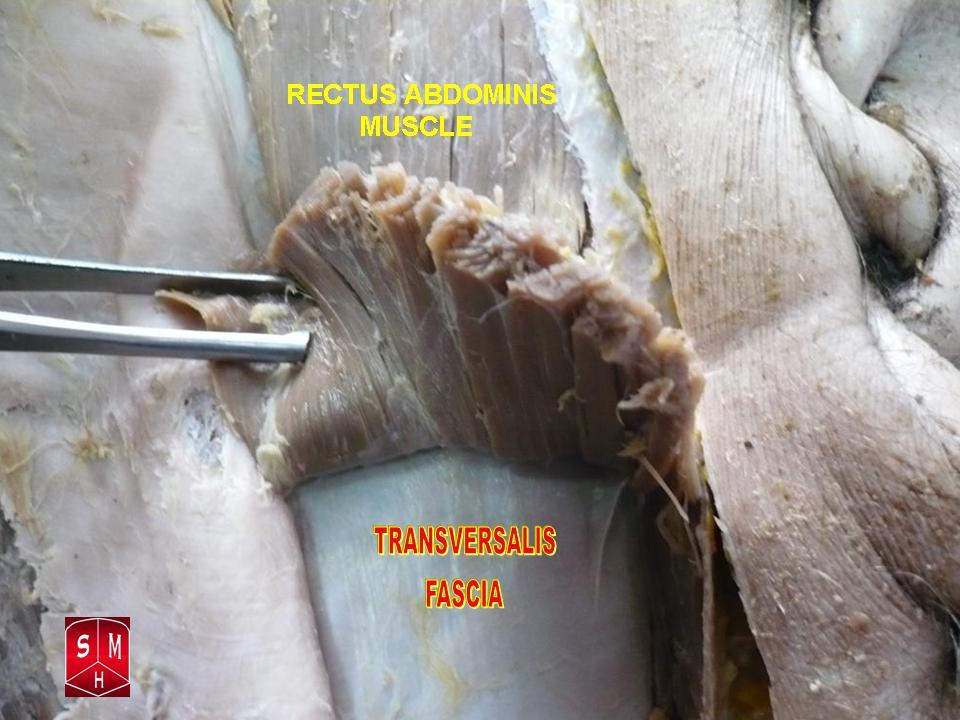
Transversalis fascia

Diagram of sheath of rectus.

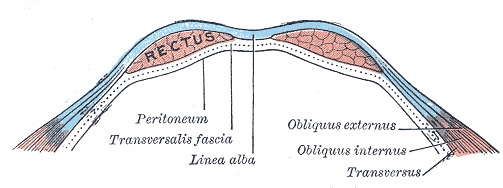
Diagram of a transverse section through the anterior abdominal wall, below the linea semicircularis.

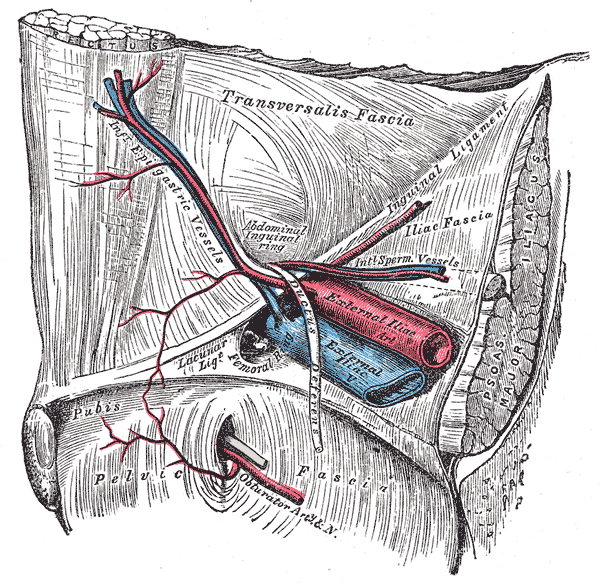
Gray547.png
