= Inferior epigastric vessels =

Blood vessels

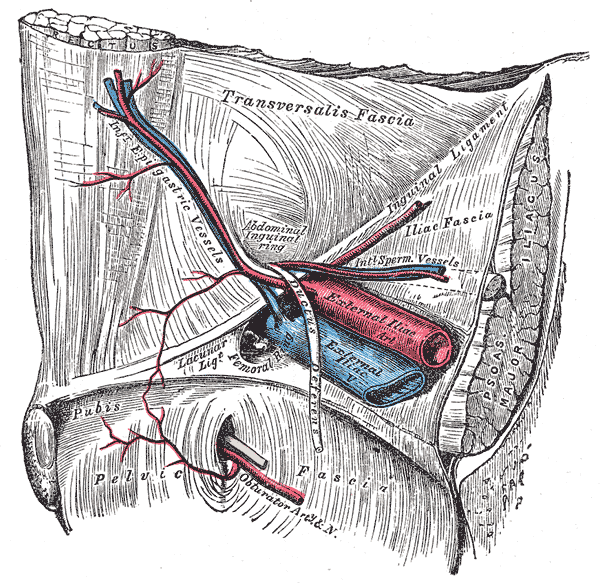
Internal (from posterior to anterior) view of right inguinal area of the male pelvis, with Inferior epigastric vessels labeled at upper left.

In human anatomy, the inferior epigastric vessels refers to the inferior epigastric artery and the inferior epigastric vein.

== See also ==
- Terms for anatomical location
- Hesselbach's triangle
