= Internal spermatic fascia =

Thin layer around the spermatic cord

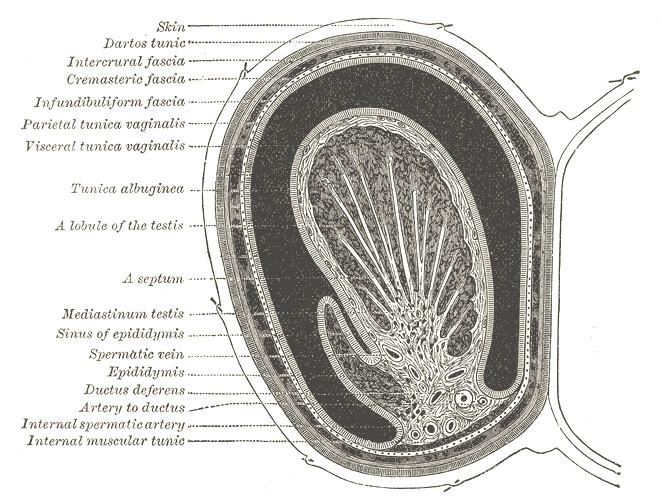
- Transverse section through the left side of the scrotum and the left testis. The sac of the tunica vaginalis is represented in a distended condition. (Infundibuliform fascia labeled at left, fourth from top.)

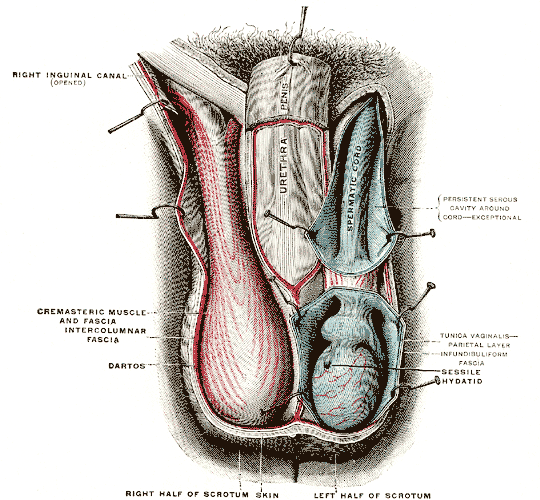
- The scrotum. On the left side the cavity of the tunica vaginalis has been opened; on the right side only the layers superficial to the Cremaster have been removed.

Details

Identifiers
- Latin: fascia spermatica interna
- TA98: A09.3.04.005
- TA2: 3619
- FMA: 77299

The internal spermatic fascia (infundibuliform fascia or Le deuxième fascia de Webster) is a thin layer, which loosely invests the spermatic cord.

== Structure ==
The internal spermatic fascia is derived from the transversalis fascia. It is acquired by the spermatic cord at the deep inguinal ring. It has very little lymphatic drainage. It is mainly supplied by sensory afferents and the sympathetic nervous system.

== Additional images ==
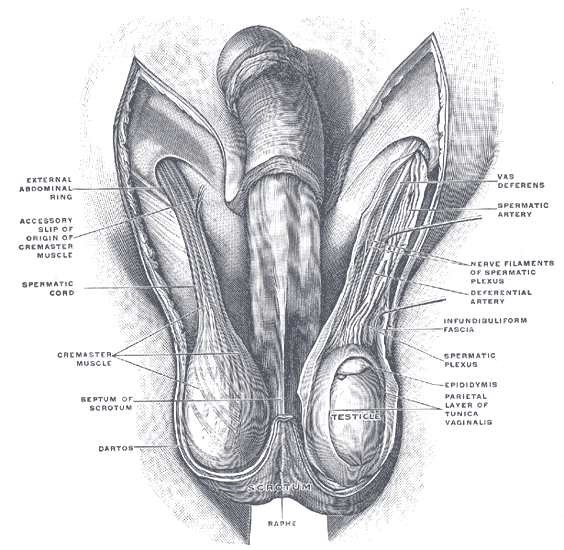
The scrotum.

Schematic drawing of a cross-section through the vaginal process.
