= Cremaster muscle =

Muscle covering the testicles and spermatic cords

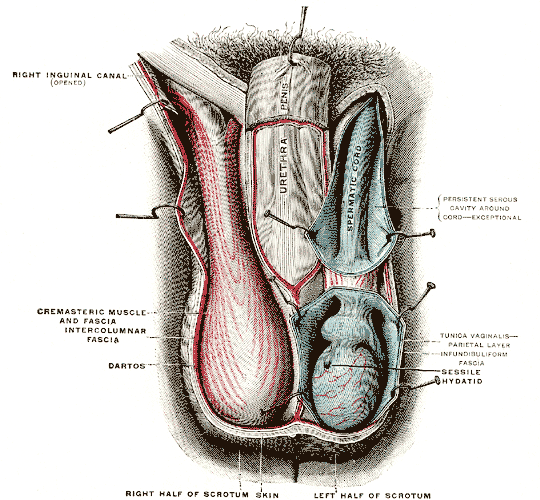
- The cremaster muscle appears as a thin layer just superficial to the tunica vaginalis

Details
- Origin: Internal oblique
- Insertion: Tunica vaginalis
- Artery: Cremasteric artery
- Nerve: Genital branch of genitofemoral nerve
- Actions: Raise and lower the scrotum

Identifiers
- Latin: musculus cremaster
- TA98: A04.5.01.018M; A09.3.04.003
- TA2: 2374, 3617
- FMA: 21531

The cremaster muscle is a paired structure made of thin layers of striated and smooth muscle that covers the testicles and the spermatic cords in human males. It consists of the lateral and medial parts. Cremaster is an involuntary muscle, responsible for the cremasteric reflex; a protective and physiologic superficial reflex of the testicles. The reflex raises and lowers the testicles in order to keep them protected. Along with the dartos muscle of the scrotum, it regulates testicular temperature, thus aiding the process of spermatogenesis.

== Structure ==
In human males, the cremaster muscle is a thin layer of striated muscle found in the inguinal canal and scrotum between the external and internal layers of spermatic fascia, surrounding the testis and spermatic cord. The cremaster muscle is a paired structure, there being one on each side of the body.

Anatomically, the lateral cremaster muscle originates from the internal oblique muscle, just superior to the inguinal canal, and the middle of the inguinal ligament. The medial cremaster muscle, which sometimes is absent, originates from the pubic tubercle and sometimes the lateral pubic crest. Both insert into the tunica vaginalis underneath the testis.

=== Blood supply ===
The cremaster muscle is supplied by the cremasteric artery, a branch of the inferior epigastric artery, along with anastomotic flow from the other arteries supplying the scrotum.

=== Nerve supply ===
The cremaster muscle is innervated from the sensory and motor fibers of the genitofemoral nerve that originates from the L1 and L2 spinal nerve nuclei. It receives distinctly different innervation and vascular supply in comparison to the internal oblique.

=== Development ===
The cremaster muscle develops to its full extent only in males; in females, the muscle is smaller and is found on the round ligament, where it is represented by only a few muscle loops.

In rats, it has been shown that cremaster muscles developed from the gubernacular bulb.

== Function ==
=== Retraction ===
The cremaster muscle's function is to raise and lower the testes in order to regulate scrotal temperature for optimal spermatogenesis and survival of the resultant spermatozoa. The ideal temperature for human sperm development is around 34.5-35 degrees Celsius, which is about 2-2.5 degrees Celsius below body temperature. Temperature is regulated by increasing or decreasing the exposed surface area of the surrounding tissue, allowing faster or slower dissipation of body heat. The amount of retraction or relaxation is directly related to how far the environmental temperatures are from the ideal. Cremaster works alongside the dartos muscle in order to maintain homeostasis for the reproductive organs and protect them from physical damage. When a man is cold or sexually stimulated, the dartos muscle causes the scrotum to become more wrinkled and smaller as it is retracted closer to the body. In warmer conditions, the dartos allows for less wrinkling and the scrotum becomes looser.

The cremaster muscle is an involuntary muscle and contraction can occur during arousal which can prevent injury to the testicles during sexual intercourse. Contraction also occurs during orgasm and ejaculation. The muscle may contract during moments of extreme fear, possibly to help avoid injuring the testes while dealing with a fight or flight situation.

Clinically, a reflex arc termed the cremasteric reflex can be demonstrated by lightly stroking the skin of the inner thigh downwards from the hip towards the knee. This stimulates the sensory fibers of the ilioinguinal nerve, which enters the spinal cord at L1. The sensory fibers stimulate the motor fibers of the genital branch of the genitofemoral nerve (also at spinal level L1), which provides innervation to the cremaster muscles causing the contraction of the muscle and elevation of the testes. This causes the cremaster muscle on the same side to rapidly contract, raising the testicle.

The cremaster can also be contracted voluntarily, by performing Kegels (which somehow contracts the cremaster), or by flexing and tightening the abdominal muscles.

== Clinical significance ==
The cremaster muscle occasionally experiences painful spasms or cramps in adult males which can be chronic and debilitating. Treatment for these spasms ranges from minor surgery to injection with Botulinum A toxin to the regular application of heat to relax the muscle. Surgery, including the excision of the cremaster muscle, has apparently been able to provide complete relief from this condition without significant side effects.

== Etymology ==
The name of the cremaster muscle is derived from the Ancient Greek noun κρεμαστήρ (kremastḗr), meaning "suspender"; its plural, κρεμᾰστῆρες (kremastēres), was used by Galen in the sense of "cremaster muscle".

== Additional images ==
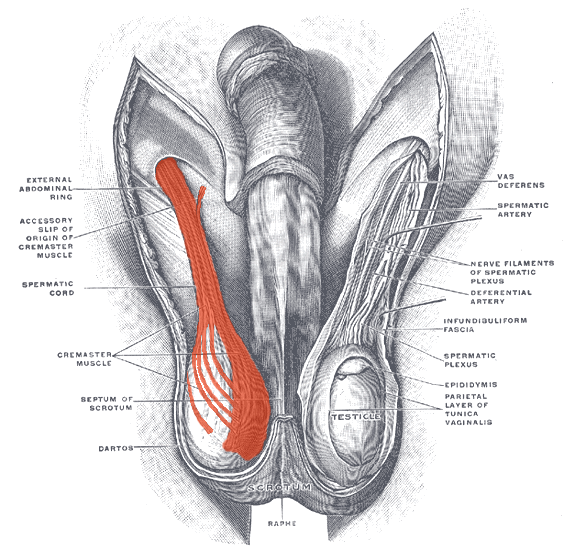
The scrotum

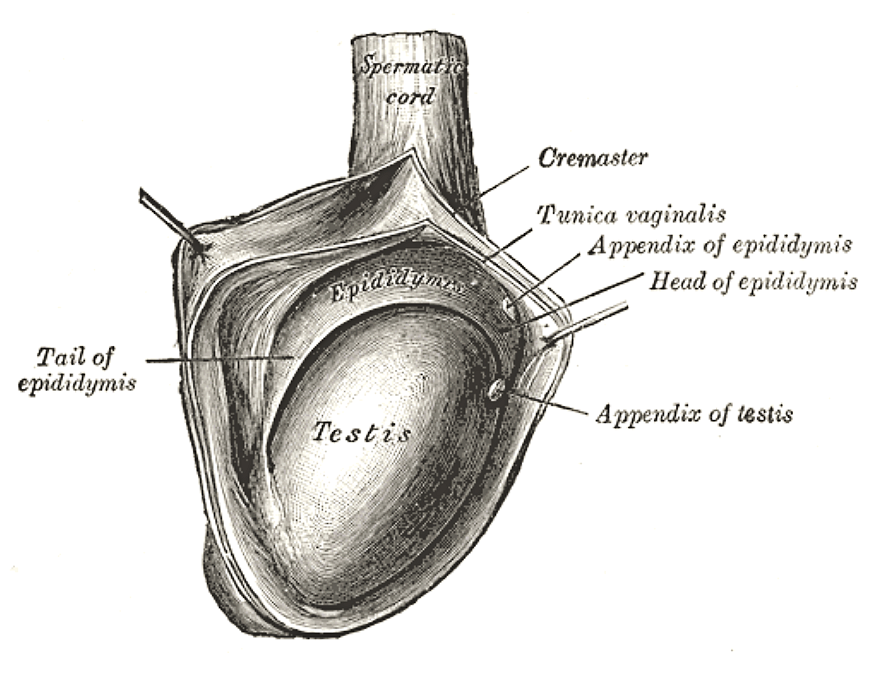
The right testis, exposed by laying open the tunica vaginalis

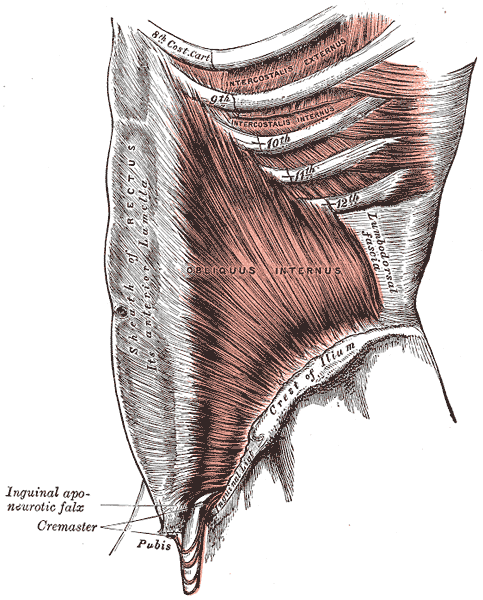
The cremaster muscle originates from the internal oblique muscle

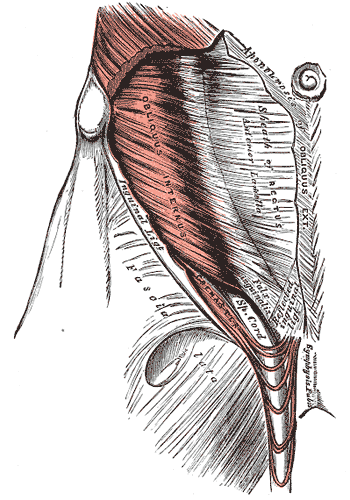
