= Epigastric vessels =

Group of blood vessels of the abdomen

Epigastric vessels refer to the epigastric arteries and veins. There are three epigastric arteries the superficial, superior and inferior. The veins are named in the same way with a superficial, superior and inferior epigastric vein.
