= Modified Gibson incision =

The Modified Gibson incision is a transverse incision above the pubis, frequently used in gynecological and urological surgeries. This incision can be made on either side of the midline, but often on the left. It is started 3 cm above and parallel to the inguinal ligament and extended vertically 3 cm medial to the anterior superior iliac spine up to the umbilicus. The modified Gibson incision allows proper access to the small bowel and pelvic organs and limited access to omentum. It is also possible to have tactile assessment of large bowel and subdiaphragmatic surfaces using this incision. This incision is preferred for lymph node dissection, as extra peritoneal approach of pelvic sidewall is possible. The inferior epigastric vessels and round ligament are ligated to provide easy exposure. If traction to the peritoneum is high, there is a chance for avulsion of the inferior mesenteric artery and inferior mesenteric vein.
