= Superficial epigastric =

Superficial epigastric may refer to:

- Superficial epigastric artery
- Superficial epigastric vein
