= Epigastric veins =

Epigastric veins may refer to:

- Inferior epigastric vein
- Superior epigastric vein
- Superficial epigastric vein
