= Pyramidalis muscle =

Small triangular muscle in the abdomen

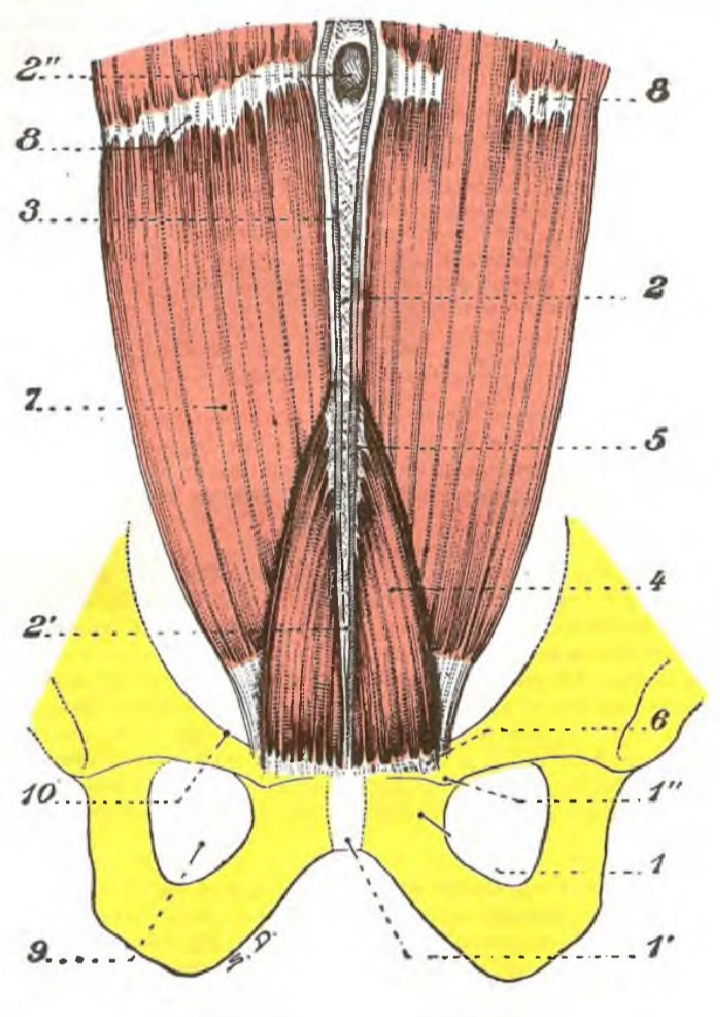
- Picture depicting both pyramidalis muscles (right-sided one is labeled 4); posterior view. (After Testut's Anatomy.)

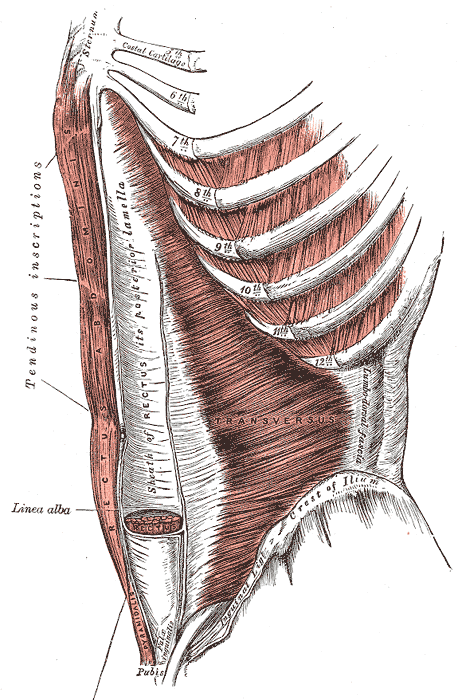
- Muscles at the front of the abdomen, showing the pyramidalis at the bottom centre.

Details
- Origin: Pubic symphysis and pubic crest
- Insertion: Linea alba
- Artery: Inferior and superior epigastric arteries
- Nerve: Subcostal nerve (T12)
- Actions: Tensing the linea alba

Identifiers
- Latin: musculus pyramidalis
- TA98: A04.5.01.007
- TA2: 2363
- FMA: 15568

The pyramidalis muscle is a small triangular muscle, anterior to the rectus abdominis muscle, and contained in the rectus sheath.

== Structure ==
The pyramidalis muscle is part of the anterior abdominal wall. Inferiorly, the pyramidalis muscle attaches to the pelvis in two places: the pubic symphysis and pubic crest, arising by tendinous fibers from the anterior part of the pubis and the anterior pubic ligament.

Superiorly, the fleshy portion of the pyramidalis muscle passes upward, diminishing in size as it ascends, and ends by a pointed extremity which is inserted into the linea alba, midway between the umbilicus and pubis.

=== Nerve supply ===
The pyramidalis muscle is innervated by the ventral portion of T12.

=== Blood supply ===
The pyramidalis is most commonly supplied by a separate branch of the inferior epigastric artery, but it may also be supplied by the superior epigastric artery in few cases. It is drained by the respective named veins.

=== Variation ===
The pyramidalis muscle is present in 80% of human population. It may be absent on one or both sides; the lower end of the rectus then becomes proportionately increased in size.

Occasionally, it is doubled on one side, and the muscles of the two sides are sometimes of unequal size. It may also extend higher than the usual level.

== Function ==
The pyramidalis muscle tenses the linea alba when contracting.

== Clinical significance ==
While making the longitudinal incision for a classical caesarean section, the pyramidalis muscle is used to determine midline and location of the linea alba.

== Injury ==
In sports medicine the pyramidalis muscle forms part of the PLAC complex, for assessing adductor longus avulsions. The pyramidalis muscle is not often thought to be injured in isolation, with most injuries in professional athletes occurring in association with the muscles of the PLAC complex: pyramidalis muscle, anterior pubic ligament and adductor longus muscle and tendon.

== Additional images ==
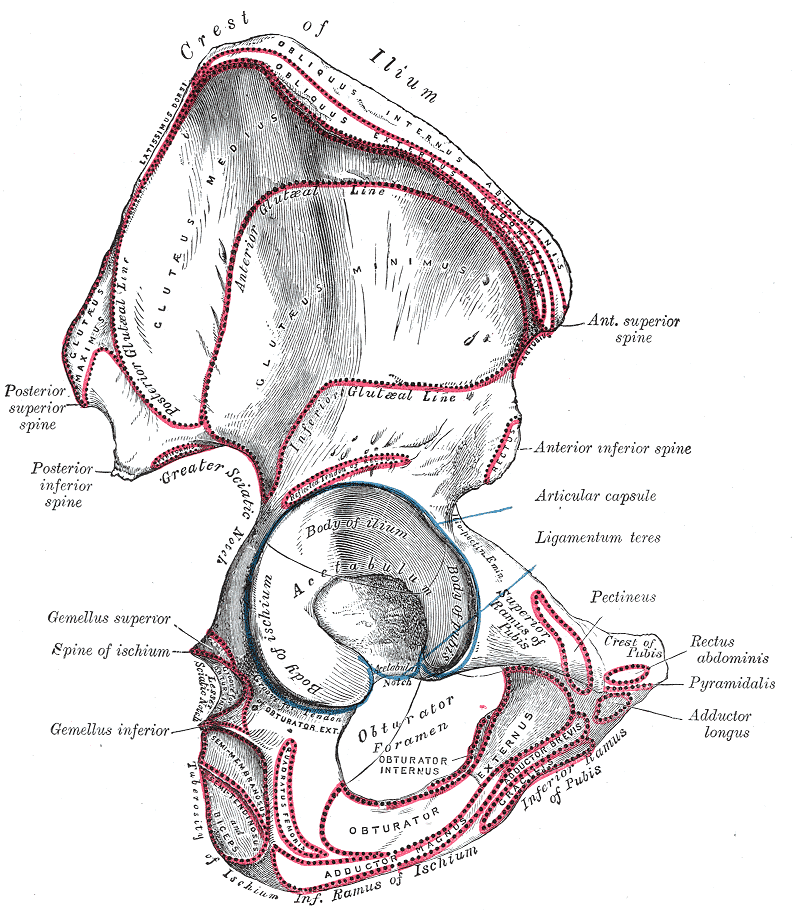
Right hip bone viewed from outside, showing a small line where the pyramidalis attaches
