= Epigastric arteries =

Epigastric arteries can refer to:

- Superficial epigastric artery
- Superior epigastric artery
- Inferior epigastric artery
