= Rectus sheath hematoma =

Accumulation of blood in the sheath of the rectus abdominis muscle

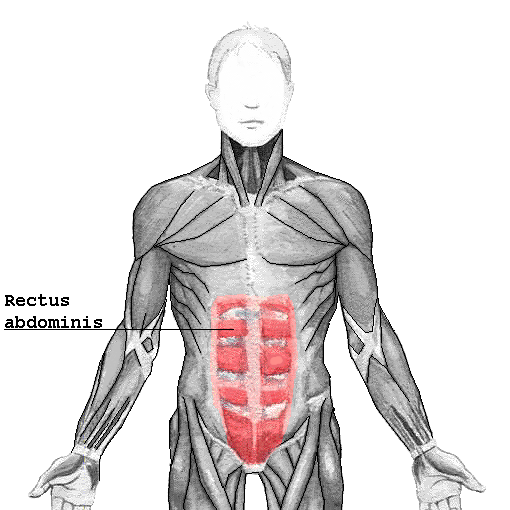
- Rectus abdominis muscle

A rectus sheath hematoma is an accumulation of blood in the rectus sheath, which surrounds the rectus abdominis muscle. It causes abdominal pain with or without a mass.

The hematoma may be caused by either rupture of the epigastric artery or by a muscular tear. Several factors have been identified as predisposing risks for rectus sheath hematoma, including coughing, straining, exercise, hypertension, obesity, previous abdominal surgery, subcutaneous injection, trauma and anticoagulant therapy. With an aging population and the widespread use of anticoagulant medications, there is evidence that this historically benign condition is becoming more common and more serious. Anticoagulant therapy is used to treat many diseases. However, in the COVID-19 pandemic, anticoagulant therapy was frequently used and therefore the incidence of rectus sheath hematoma increased. Given that thrombotic events have been documented in numerous studies, it is advisable to initiate prophylactic and anticoagulant treatment during the early phase of COVID-19 disease.

On abdominal examination, people may have a positive Carnett's sign.

Most hematomas resolve without treatment, but they may take several months to resolve.

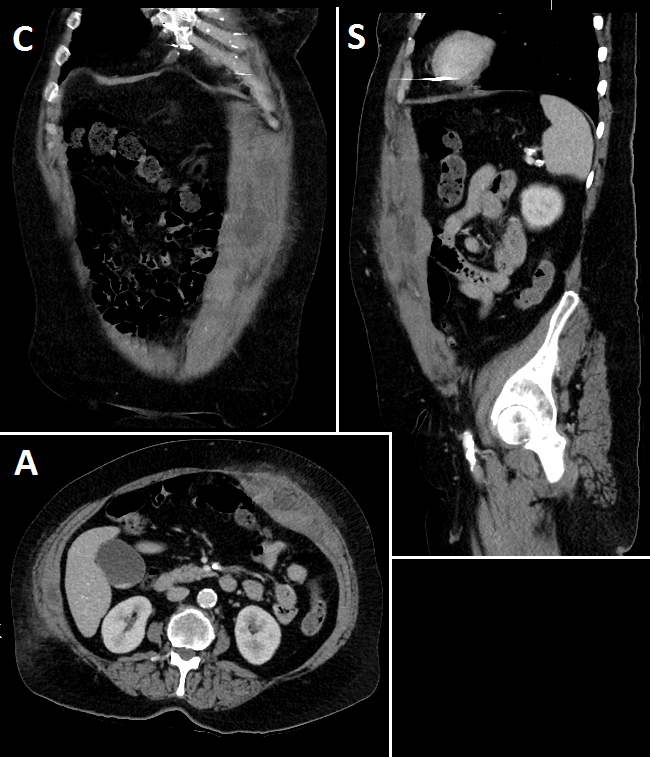
Multiplanar CT scan of a spontaneous rectus sheath hematoma because of warfarin treatment.

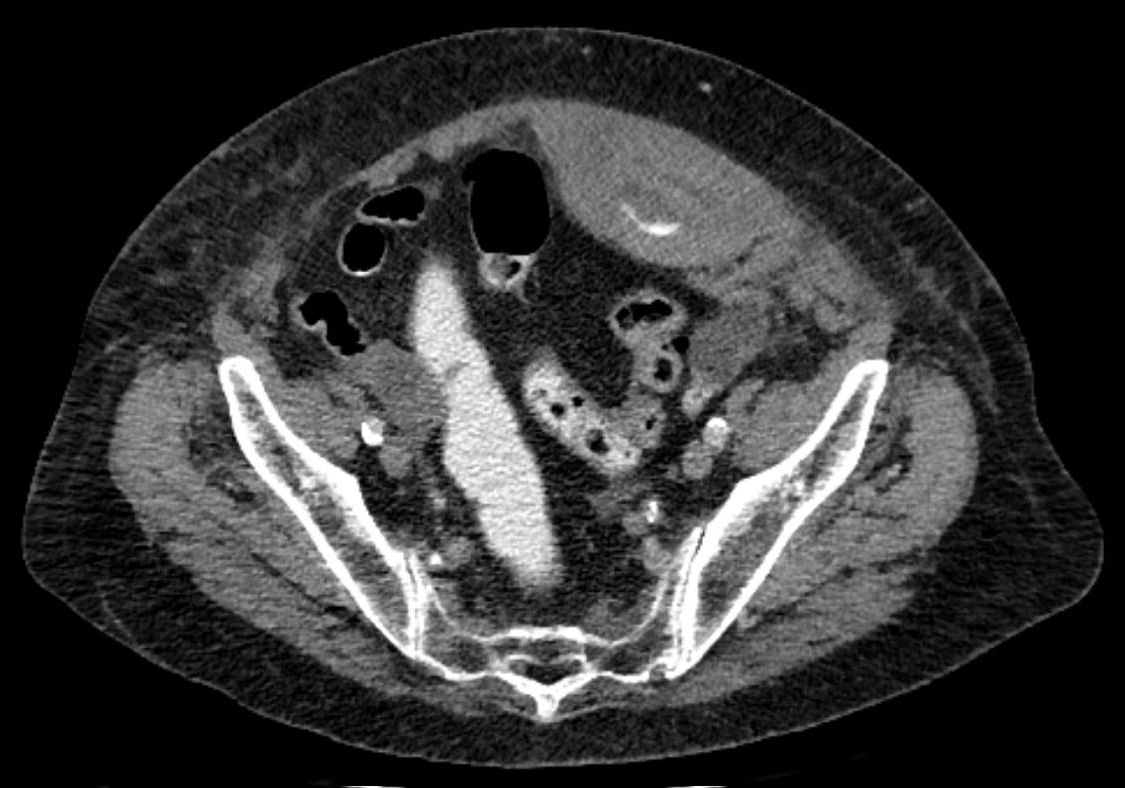
Rectus sheath hematoma seen on axial CT – with active bleeding under Marcoumar

Rectus sheath hematoma as seen on ultrasound
