= Arcuate line of rectus sheath =

Line of demarcation in the human abdomen

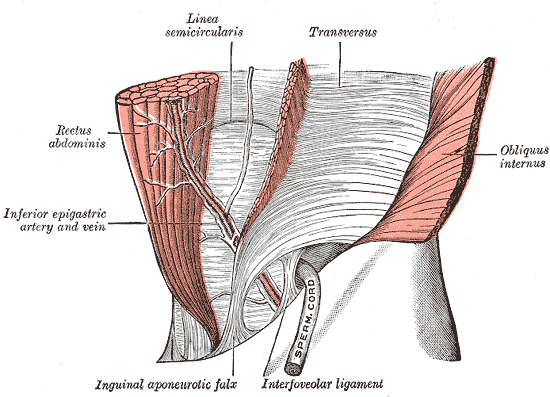
- The interfoveolar ligament, seen from in front. (Linea semicircularis labeled at center top.)

Details

Identifiers
- Latin: linea arcuata vaginae musculi recti abdominis
- TA98: A04.5.01.006
- TA2: 2362
- FMA: 16919

The arcuate line of rectus sheath (the arcuate line or the semicircular line of Douglas) is a line of demarcation corresponding to the free inferior margin of the posterior layer of the rectus sheath inferior to which only the anterior layer of the rectus sheath is present and the rectus abdominis muscle is therefore in direct contact with the transversalis fascia. The arcuate line is concave inferior-wards.

The arcuate line is visible upon the inner surface of the abdominal wall. The arcuate line may be a well-defined, or may be represented by a gradual waning of the aponeurotic fibres with concomitant increasing prominence of the transversalis fascia. The arcuate line occurs about midway between the umbilicus and pubic symphysis, however, this varies from person to person.

The inferior epigastric artery and vein pass across the arcuate line to enter the rectus sheath.

== Anatomy ==
Superior to the arcuate line, the internal oblique muscle aponeurosis splits to envelop the rectus abdominis muscle both anteriorly and posteriorly. The anterior layer is derived from the external oblique aponeurosis and the anterior lamina of the internal oblique aponeurosis. The posterior layer is made up of the posterior lamina of the internal oblique aponeurosis and the transversus abdominis aponeurosis.

Inferior to the arcuate line, the aponeuroses of the external oblique muscle, the internal oblique muscle, and the transversus abdominis muscle merge and pass superficial to the rectus abdominis muscle. Therefore, inferior to the arcuate line, the rectus abdominis rests directly on the transversalis fascia.

== Clinical significance ==
Spigelian hernias and, exceedingly rarely, arcuate line hernias may occur inferior to the arcuate line.

The arcuate line must be incised at its lateral-most point in order to enter the space of Retzius and space of Bogros from within the rectus sheath during surgery during retrorectus repair and transversus abdominis release.

== History ==
The arcuate line is also known as the linea semicircularis, and the semicircular line of Douglas.
