= External iliac artery =

Arteries of the pelvis

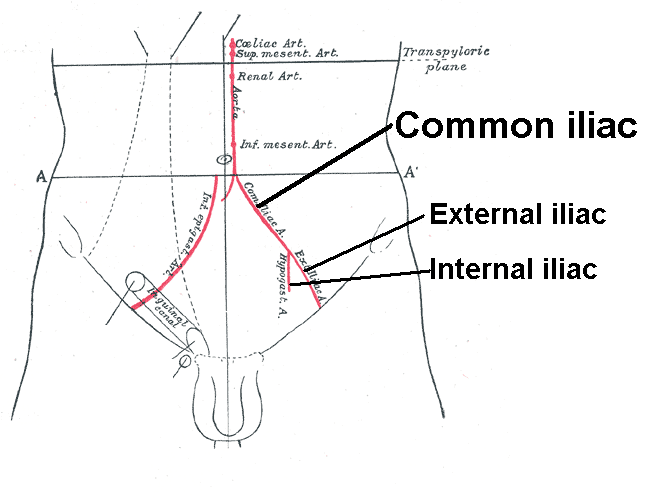
- Front of abdomen, showing common iliac artery, the source of the external iliac artery

- Volume rendered CT scan of abdominal and pelvic blood vessels.

Details
- Source: Common iliac arteries
- Branches: Femoral arteries, inferior epigastric arteries
- Vein: External iliac veins

Identifiers
- Latin: arteria iliaca externa
- TA98: A12.2.16.002
- TA2: 4357
- FMA: 18805

The external iliac arteries are two major arteries which bifurcate off the common iliac arteries anterior to the sacroiliac joint of the pelvis.

== Structure ==
The external iliac artery arises from the bifurcation of the common iliac artery. They proceed anterior and inferior along the medial border of the psoas major muscles. They exit the pelvic girdle posterior and inferior to the inguinal ligament. This occurs about one third laterally from the insertion point of the inguinal ligament on the pubic tubercle. At this point they are referred to as the femoral arteries.

=== Branches ===
Branch	Description
Inferior epigastric artery	Goes upward to anastomose with superior epigastric artery (a branch of internal thoracic artery).
Deep circumflex iliac artery	Goes laterally, travelling along the iliac crest of the pelvic bone.
Femoral artery	Terminal branch. When the external iliac artery passes posterior to the inguinal ligament, its name changes to femoral artery.

== Function ==
The external iliac artery provides the main blood supply to the legs. It passes down along the brim of the pelvis and gives off two large branches - the "inferior epigastric artery" and a "deep circumflex artery." These vessels supply blood to the muscles and skin in the lower abdominal wall. The external iliac artery passes beneath the inguinal ligament in the lower part of the abdomen and becomes the femoral artery.

== Clinical significance ==
The external iliac artery is usually the artery used to attach the renal artery to the recipient of a kidney transplant.

== Additional images ==
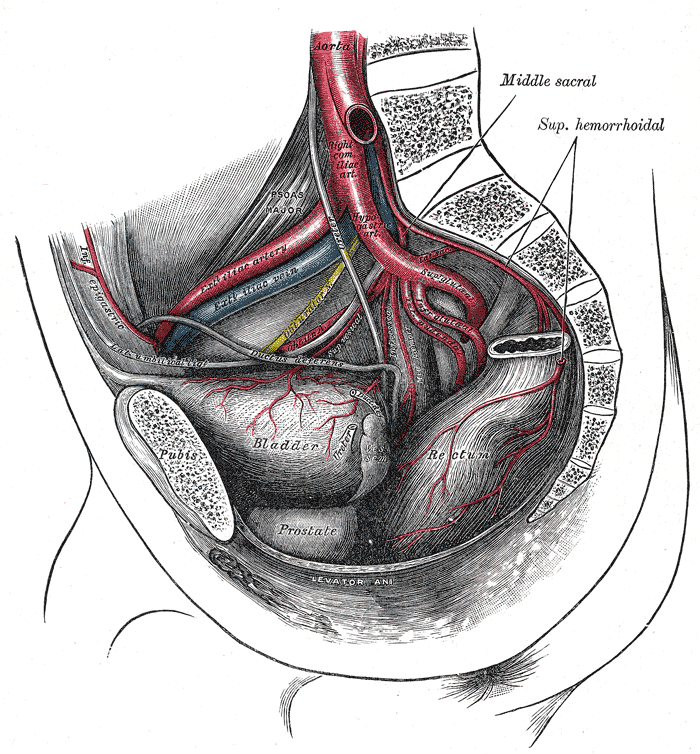
Bifurcation of the aorta and the right common iliac artery - side view. (External iliac artery is artery at upper left, seen splitting from common iliac artery at top.)

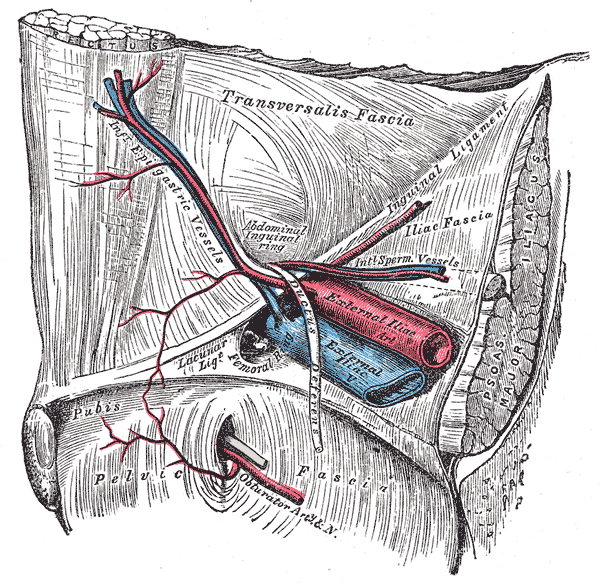
The relations of the femoral and abdominal inguinal rings, seen from within the abdomen. Right side. (External iliac artery is large artery at center, and inguinal ligament runs from upper right to lower left. When the artery crosses the ligament, it becomes the femoral artery.)

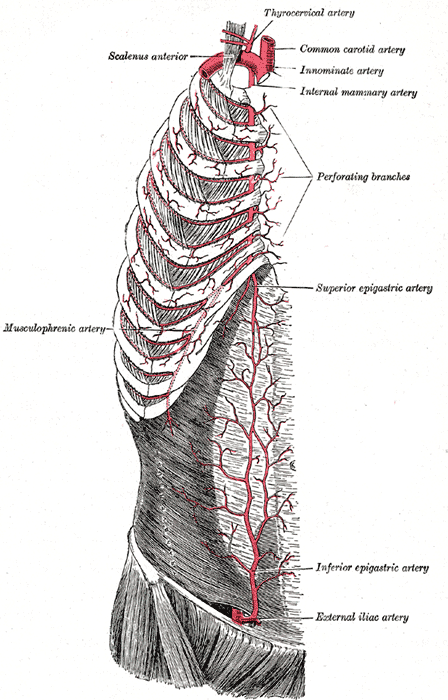
The internal mammary artery and its branches.

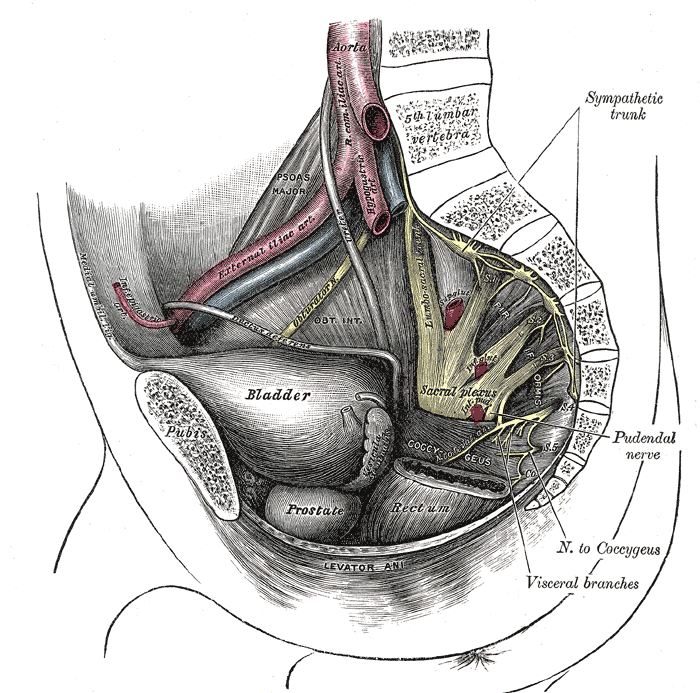
Dissection of side wall of pelvis showing sacral and pudendal plexuses.

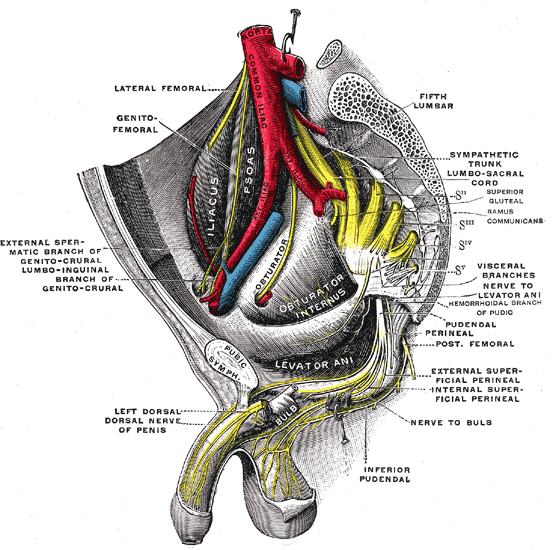
Sacral plexus of the right side.

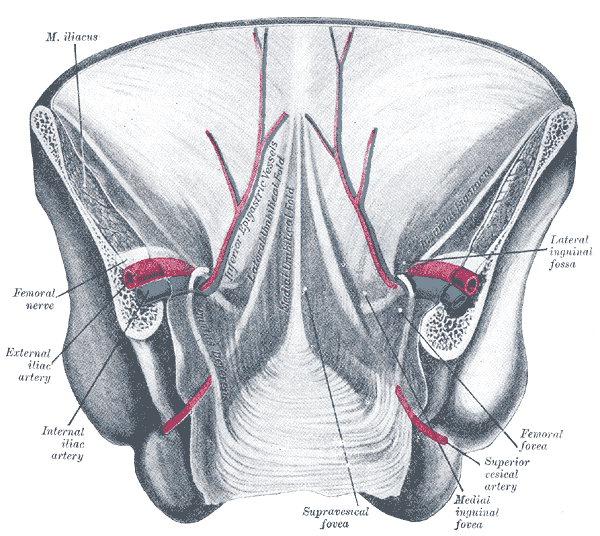
Posterior view of the anterior abdominal wall in its lower half. The peritoneum is in place, and the various cords are shining through.

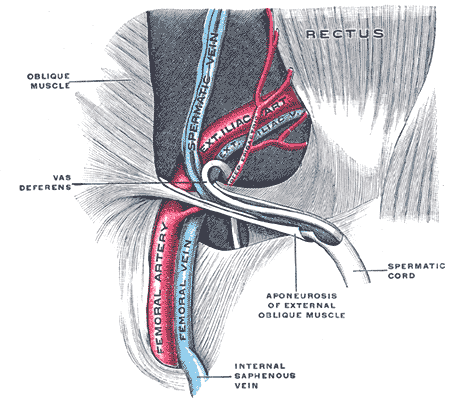
The spermatic cord in the inguinal canal.

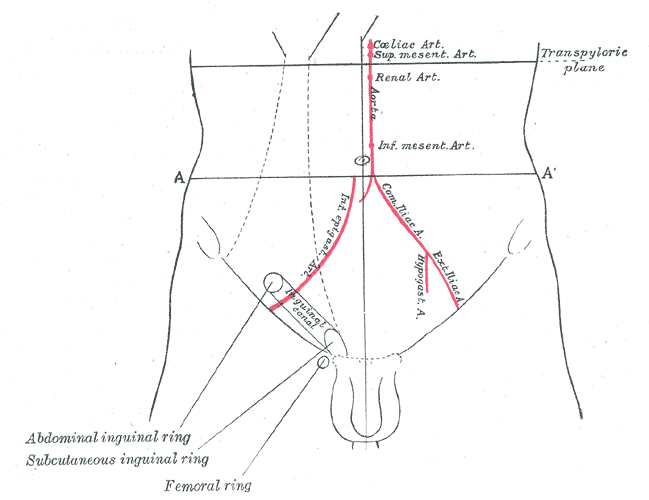
Front of abdomen, showing surface markings for arteries and inguinal canal.

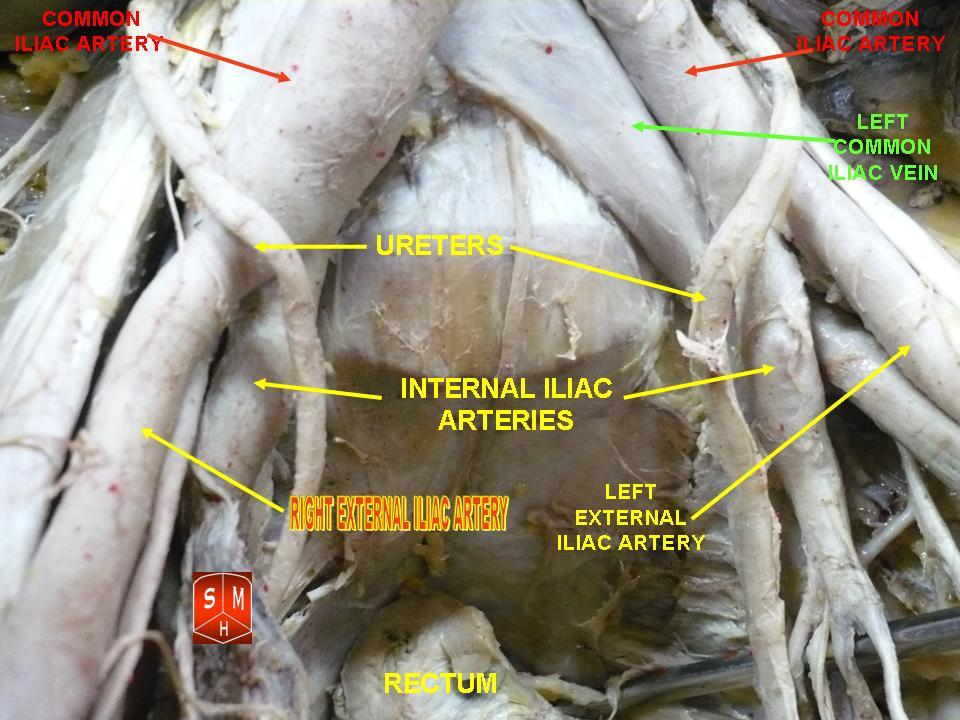
External iliac artery

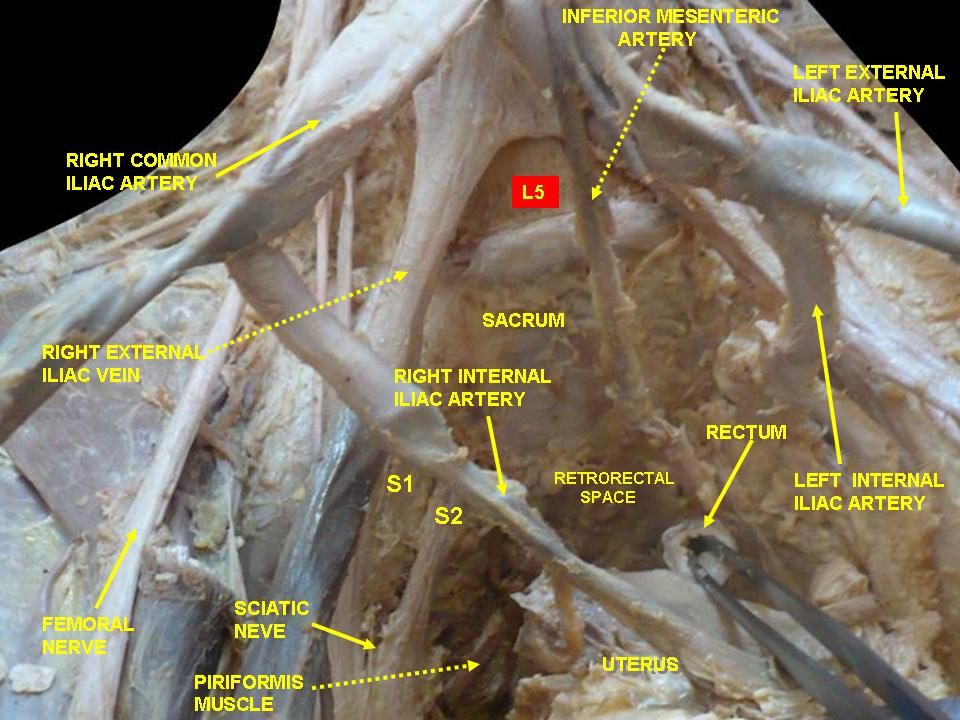
Lumbar and sacral plexus. Deep dissection. Anterior view.

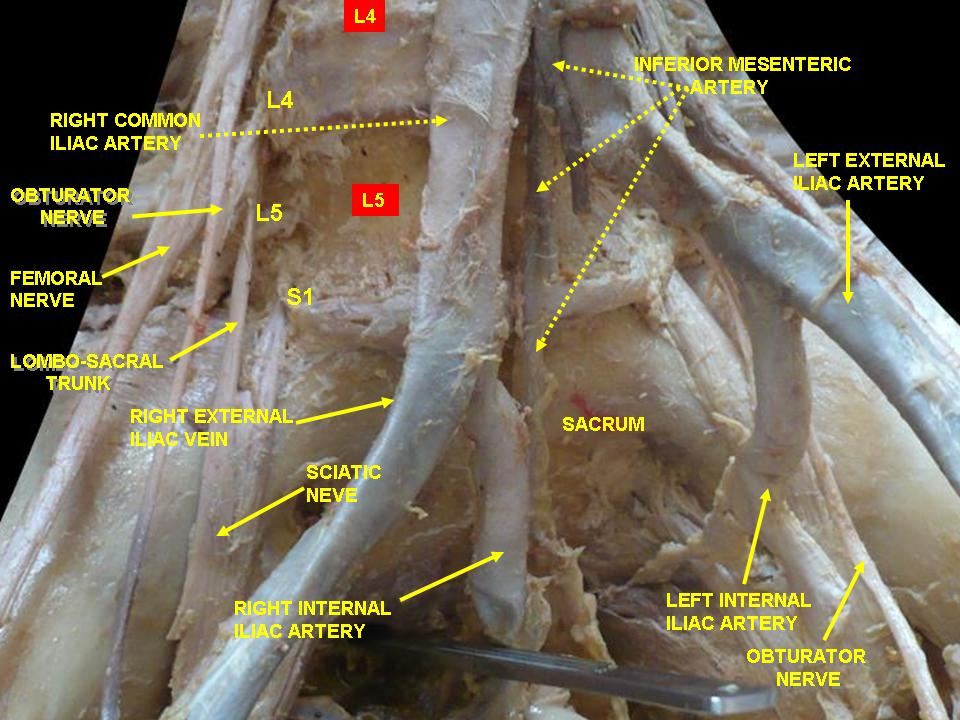
Lumbar and sacral plexus. Deep dissection. Anterior view.

== See also ==
- Internal iliac artery
- Common iliac artery
