= Pyramidalis–anterior pubic ligament–adductor longus complex =

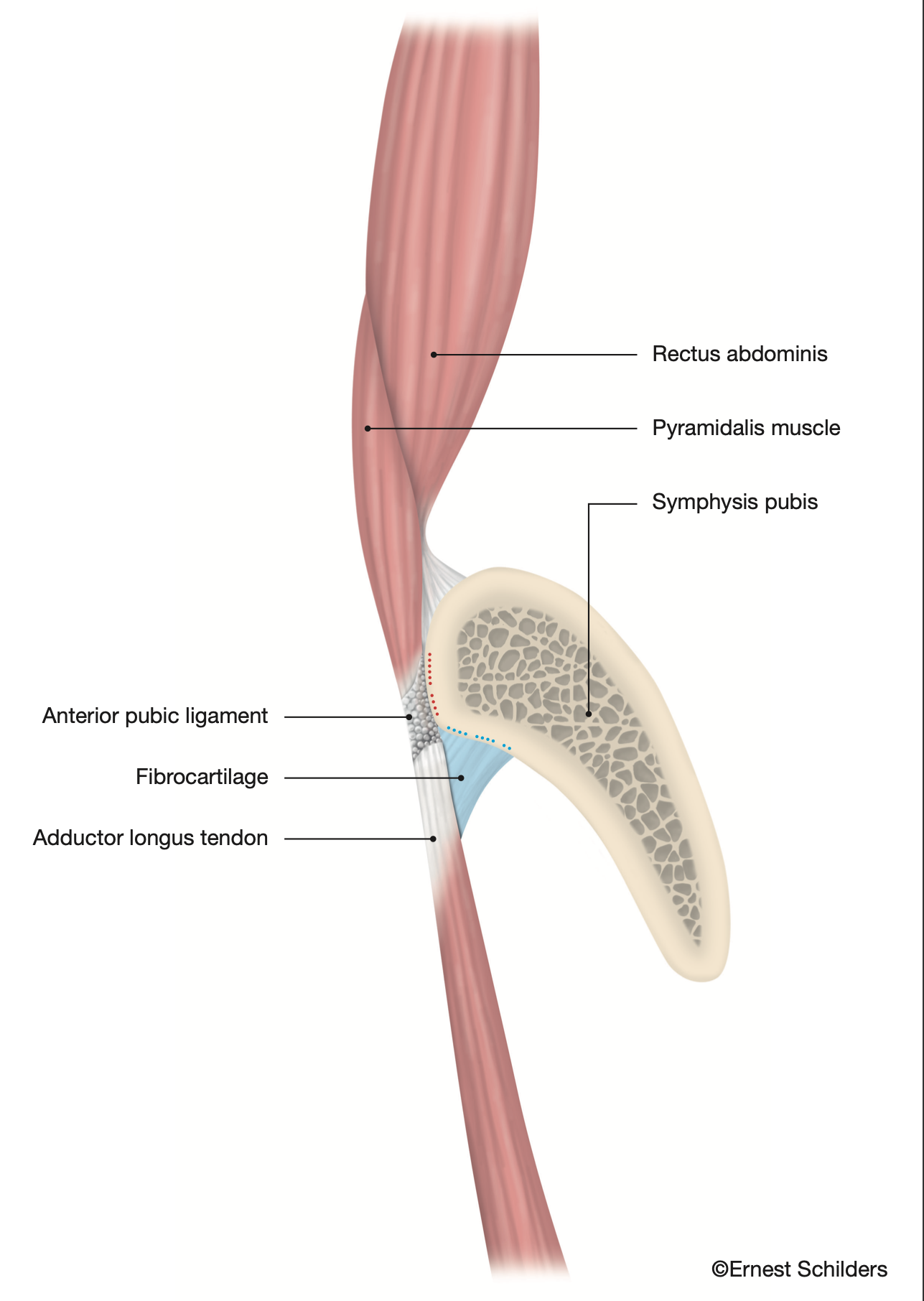
- Anatomical drawing of the PLAC (sagittal view)

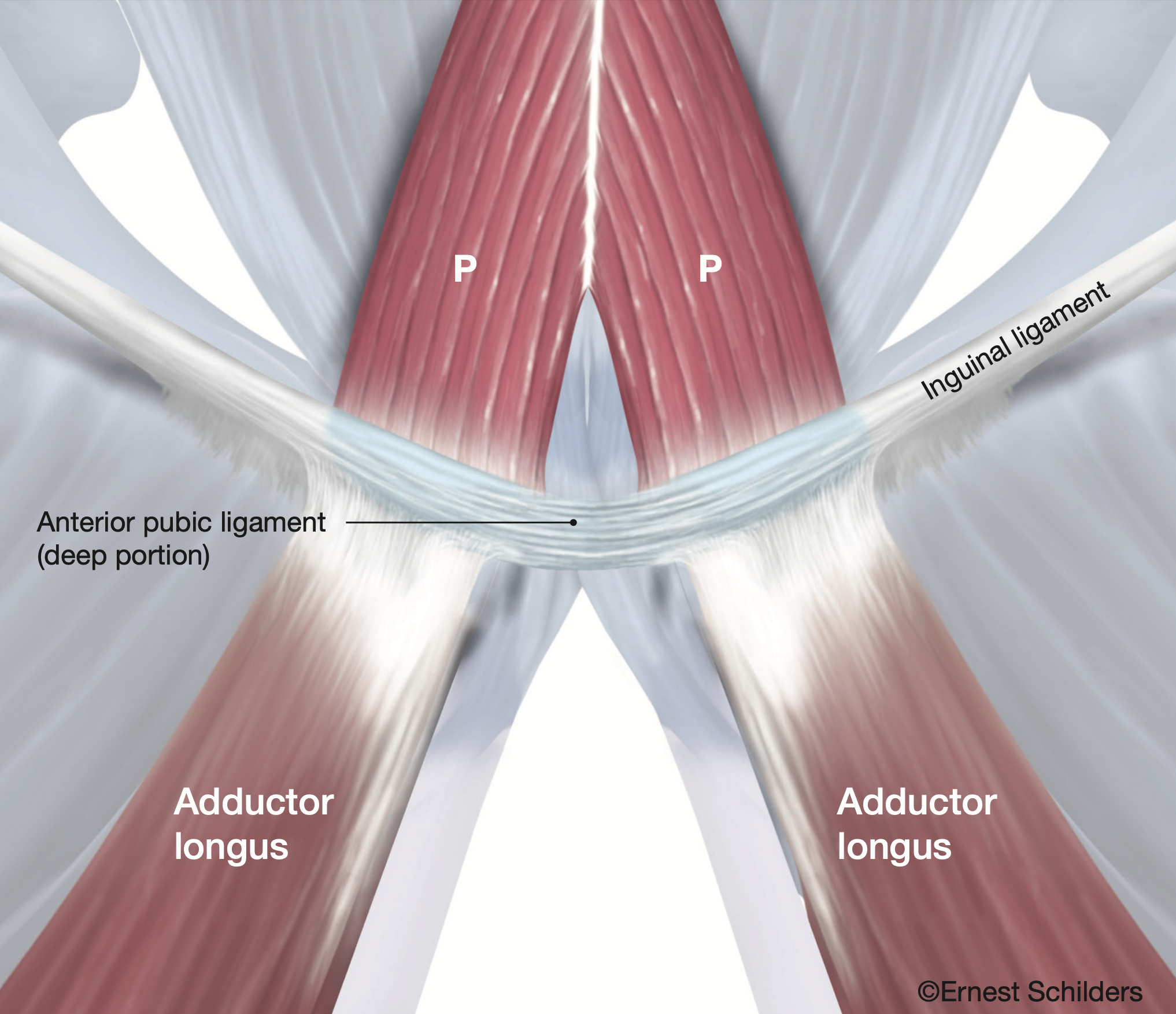
- Anatomical drawing of the PLAC (coronal view)

Details
- System: Musculoskeletal System

Identifiers
- Acronym: PLAC

The Pyramidalis–anterior pubic ligament–adductor longus complex, or the PLAC, is an anatomical concept in Sports medicine. The PLAC concept is used as a basis to classify type of adductor longus avulsions.

The PLAC concept was developed in order to provide consistency in the diagnose of different injury patterns seen with adductor longus avulsions in athletes. The PLAC injury classification explains the symptoms and clinical presentation seen with acute adductor avulsions. The PLAC classification doesn't determine whether surgery should be performed, but it informs the surgical repair strategy if operative treatment is chosen. It is a tool for future research comparing surgical and conservative management outcomes through consistent anatomical classification.

For MRI imaging the PLAC classification captures the structural complexity of adductor longus avulsions and provides a standardised anatomical framework for describing the related injuries. The MRI imaging protocol was developed to consistently and accurately define the injury patterns seen with adductor longus avlusions, replacing the outdated grading system.

PLAC injuries are most often seen in professional athletes, in sports such as association football, rugby, martial arts and ice hockey, and often the sole cause of pubalgia in athletes, and/or associated with sports hernias.

The PLAC concept was defined by Belgian Orthopaedic Surgeon Ernest Schilders in 2017.

== Structure ==
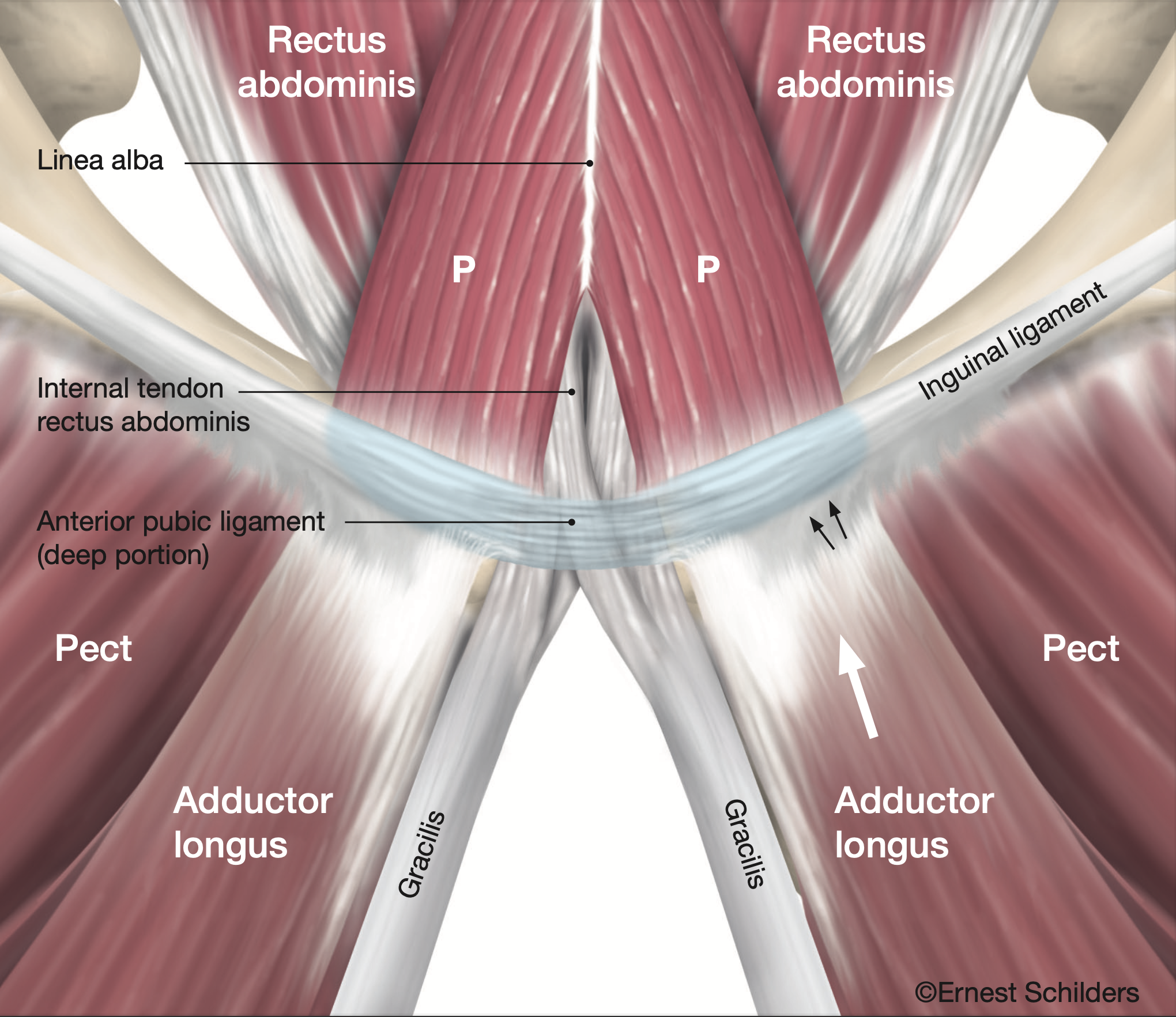
Structures in the PLAC (The pyramidalis–anterior pubic ligament–adductor longus complex).

The PLAC is composed of muscles and ligaments of the lower abdomen and groin:

- Pyramidalis muscle (P)
- Anterior pubic ligament
- Adductor longus muscle and tendon

PLAC injuries may also affect:

- Pectineus muscle (Pect)
- Rectus abdominis
- Inguinal ligament

Due to the size and location of the pyramidalis muscle, it can be mistaken for the rectus abdominis. The pyramidalis muscle is the only abdominal muscle anterior to the pubis (as displayed in the sagittal view of the PLAC). This is important for MRI imaging, as in professional athletes, due to a significantly reduction, or absence, of fat planes (adipose tissue layers) between muscles, it can be difficult to distinguish the pyramidalis from the rectus abdominis in imaging–contributing to possible over-diagnosis of rectus abdominis injuries.

- P – Pyramidalis
- L – Ligament
- A – Adductor
- C – Complex

As an acronym "PLAC" can be used as a checklist in the imaging of adductor longus avulsions to systematically assess possible damage to associated structures in the injuries.

== PLAC Injury: Symptoms and Signs ==
In professional athletes signs of a possible PLAC injury (adductor avulsion) are as follows:

- Sudden ‘pop’ sensation in the groin or adductor region during a kick, forced abduction, or reaching movement
- Inability for the athlete to continue playing immediately after the injury
- Difficulty walking post-injury
- Pain in the lower abdominal region
- Unable to perform long-lever adduction (e.g., resisted straight-leg adduction)
- Palpable gap may be present on clinical examination by a physician, but not in all cases

Early imaging in cases with professional athletes is crucial for the most accurate diagnosis to ensure swift treatment and return to play.

== PLAC Classification ==
There are six types of injury patterns seen with PLAC Injuries:

Injury	Fibrocartilage (FC) Avulsion	Pyramidalis connection to Adductor Longus	Pectineus connection to Inguinal Ligament
Type 1	Complete	Separated	Intact
Type 2	Complete	Separated	Partial tear
Type 3	Complete	Connected	Intact
Type 4	Complete	Connected	Partial tear
Type 5	Complete	Partially separated	Partial tear
Type 6	Partial	Connected	Intact

Injury types 1,2, and 3 were most common in professional athletes.

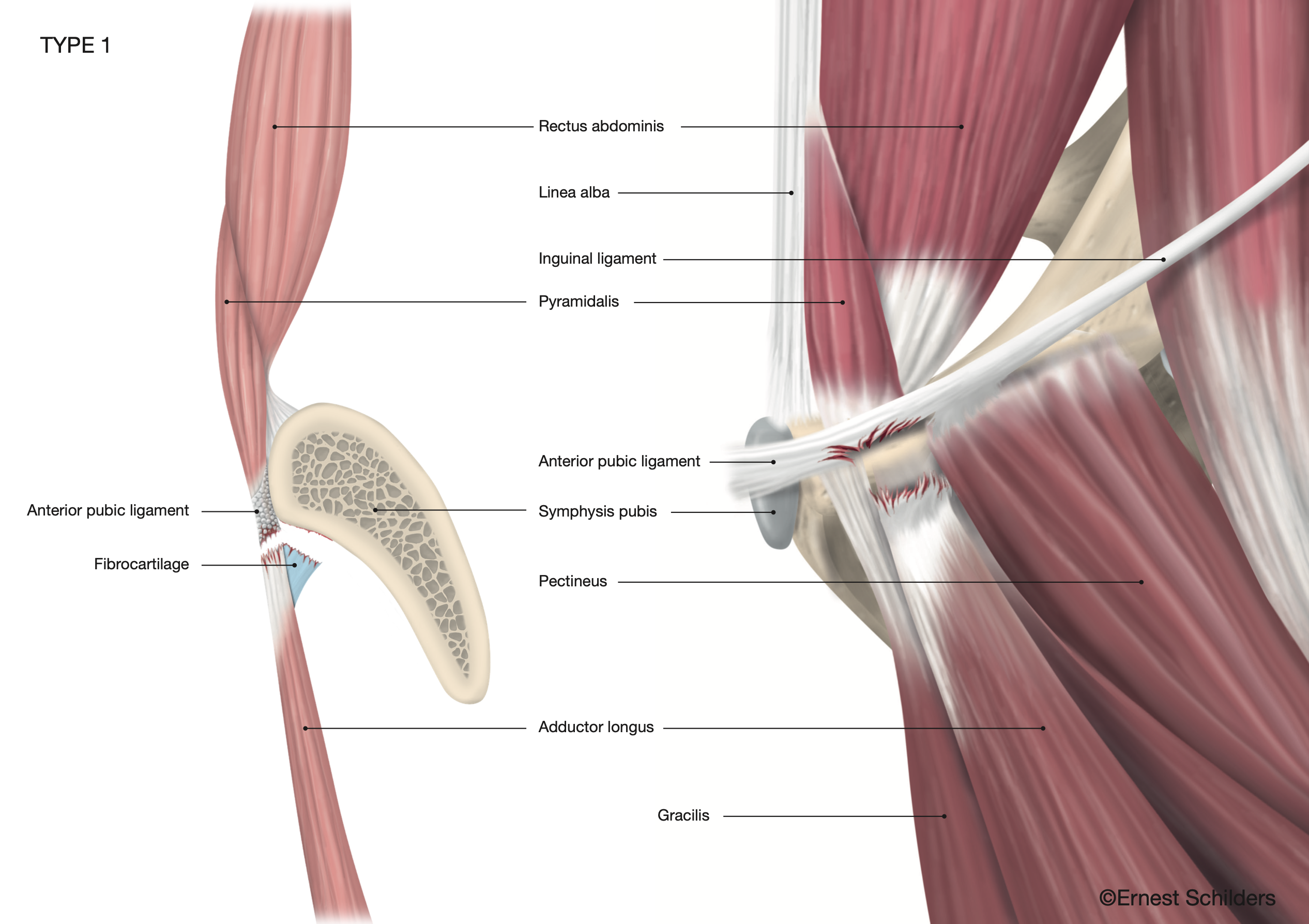
Type 1: Complete fibrocartilage (FC) avulsion–Pyramidalis separated from Adductor Longus–intact Pectineus

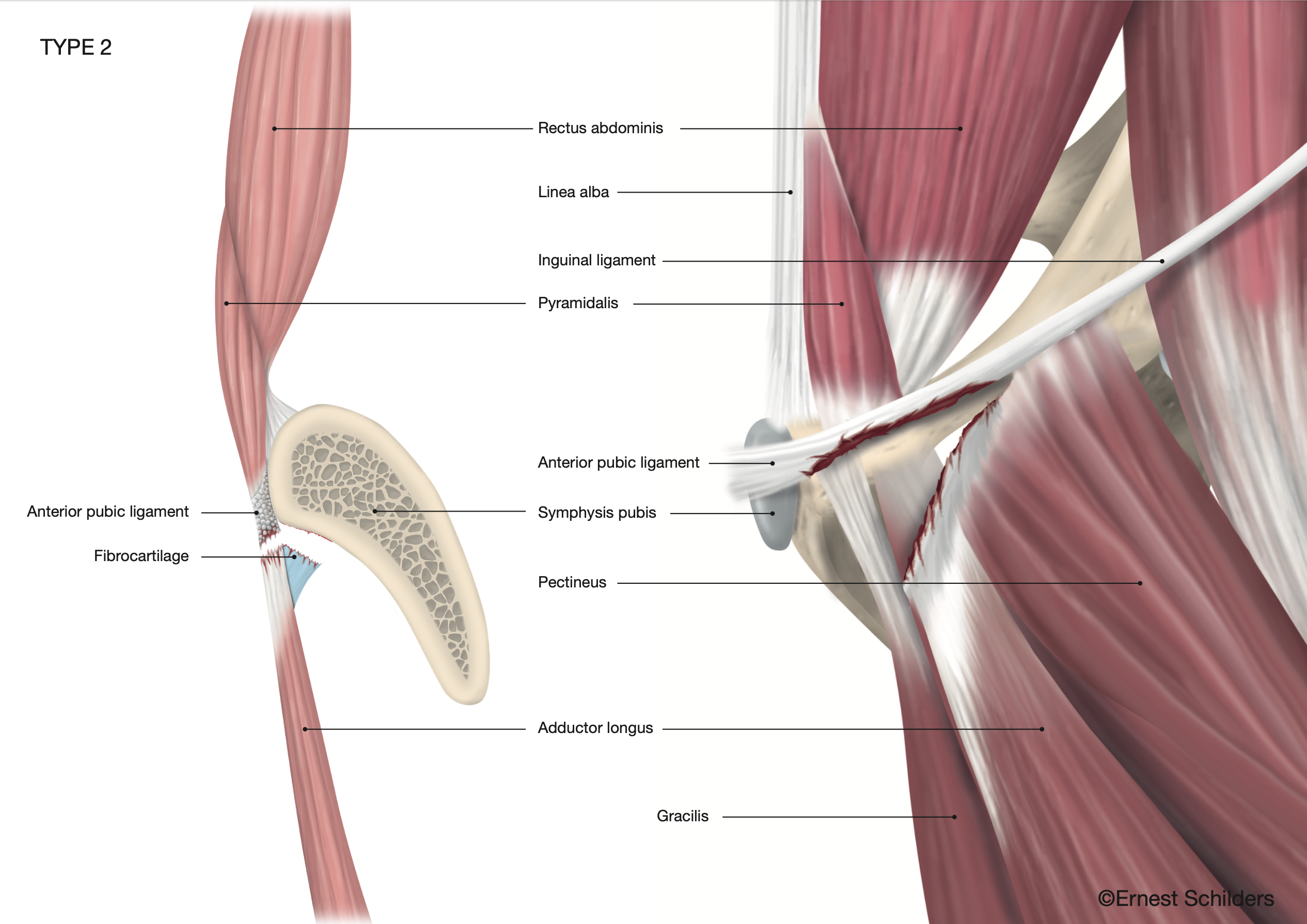
Type 2: Complete FC avulsion–Pyramidalis separated from Adductor Longus–partial Pectineus tear

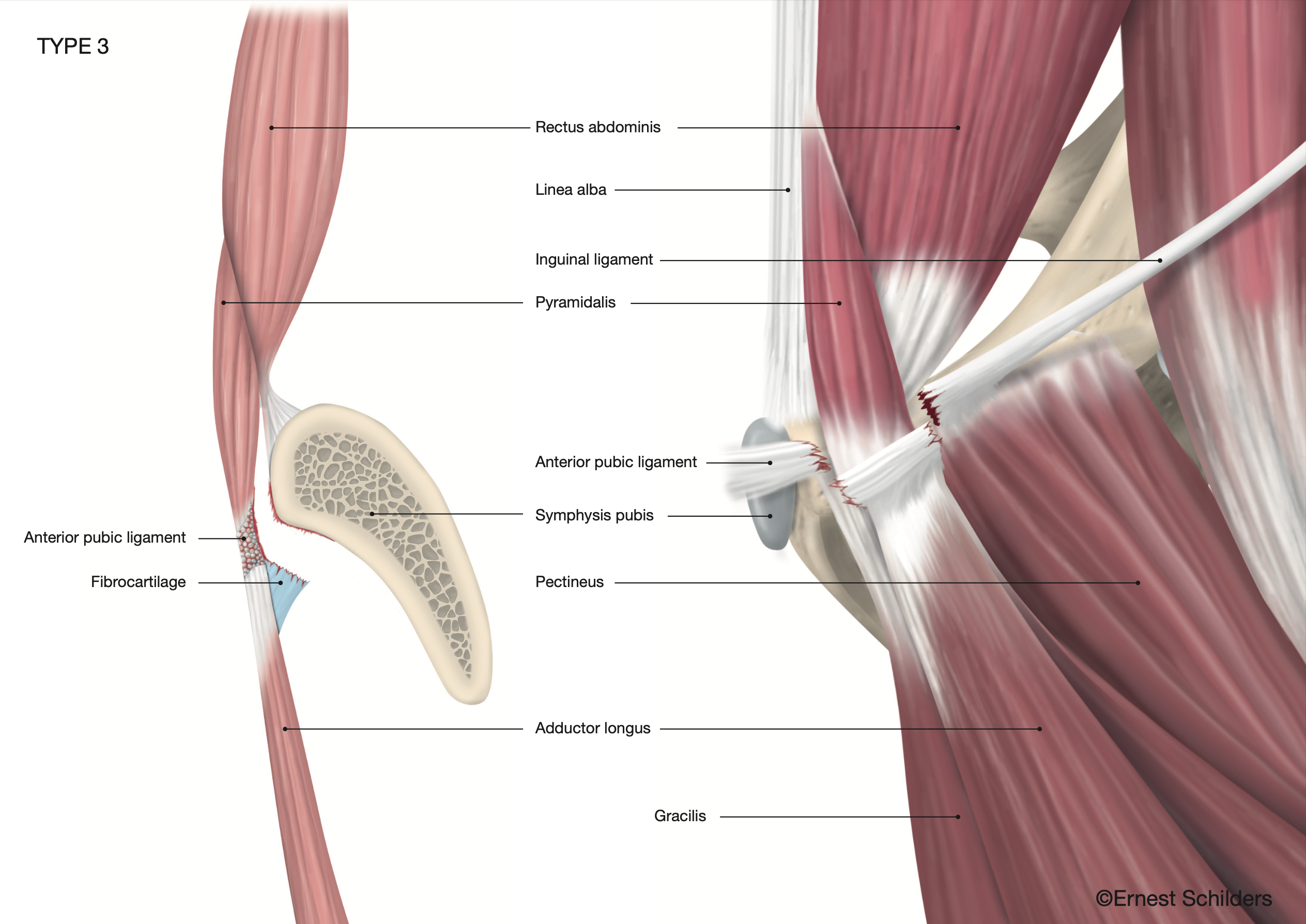
Type 3: Complete FC avulsion–Pyramidalis connected to Adductor Longus–intact Pectineus

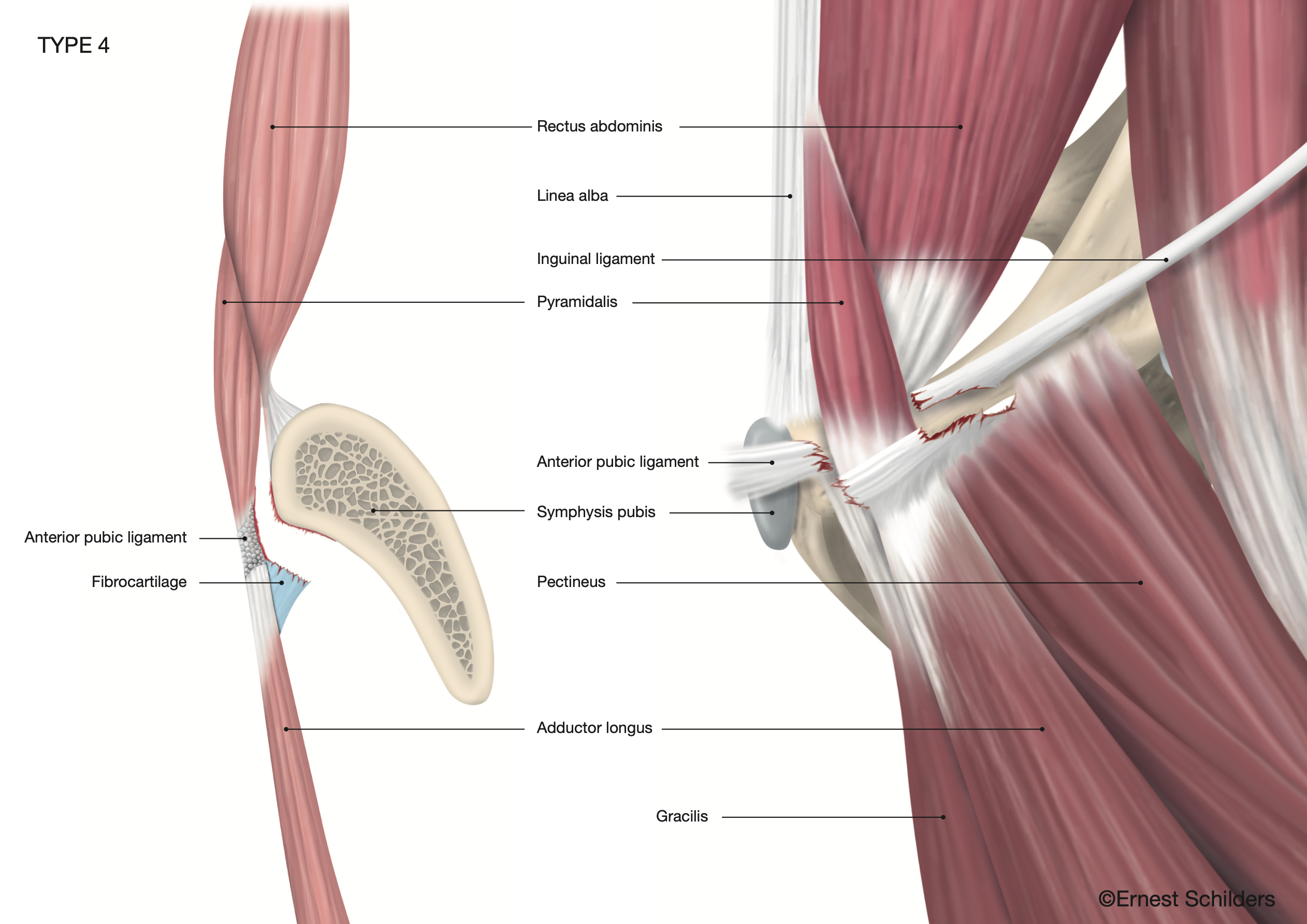
Type 4: Complete FC avulsion–Pyramidalis connected to Adductor Longus–partial Pectineus tear

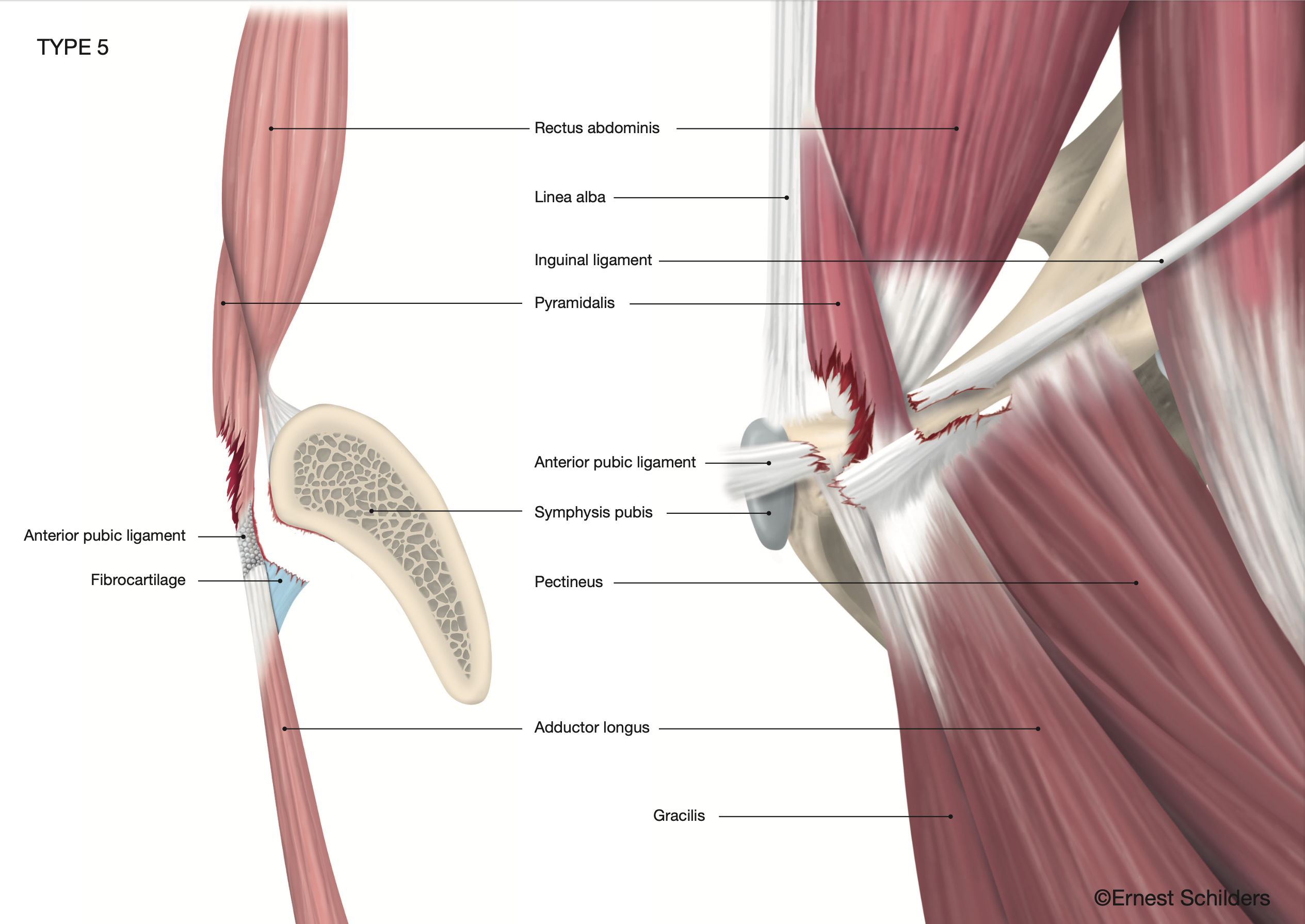
Type 5: Complete FC avulsion–Pyramidalis partially separated from Adductor Longus–partial Pectineus tear

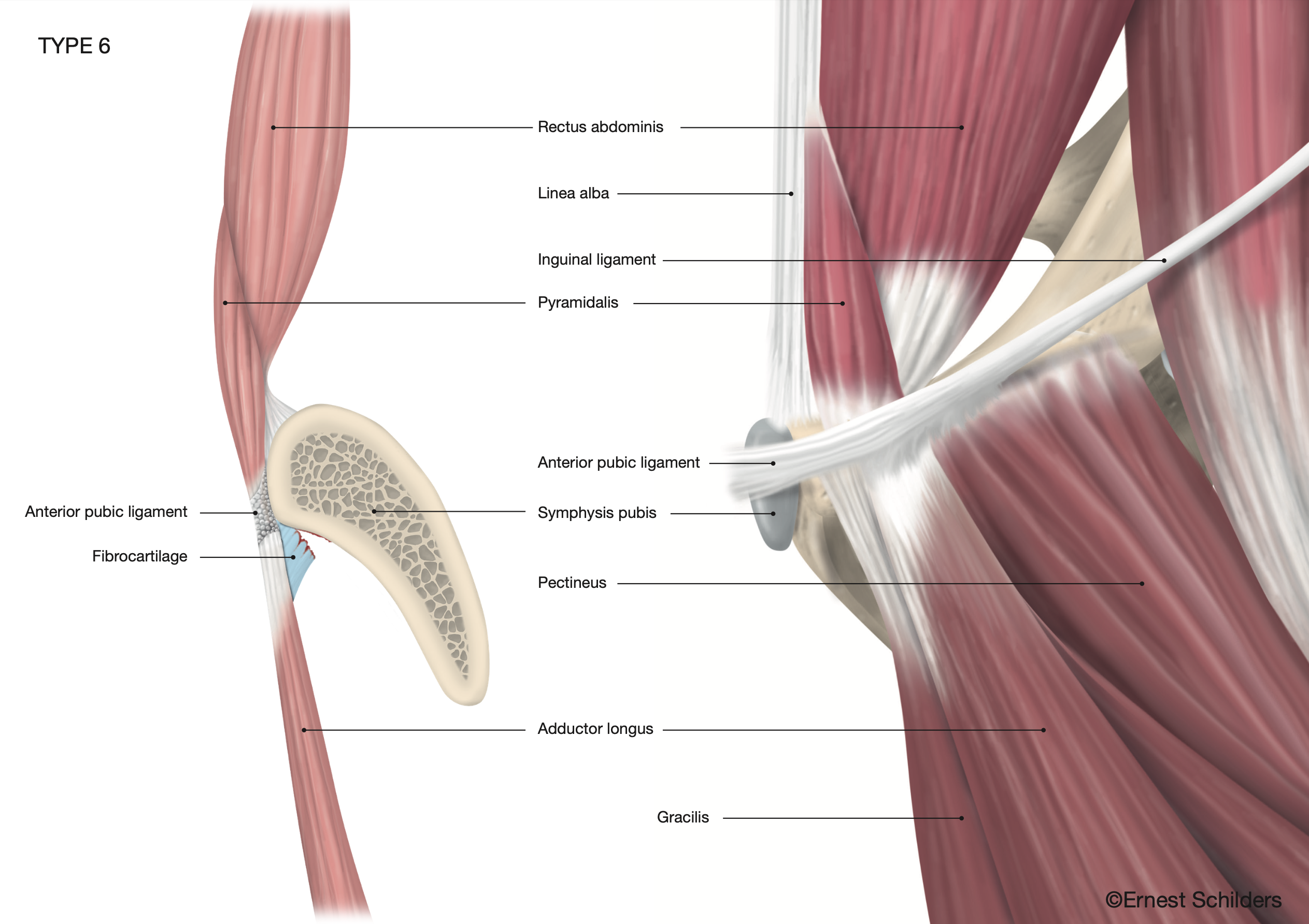
Type 6: Partial FC avulsion–Pyramidalis connected to Adductor Longus–intact Pectineus

== Imaging Protocol and Assessment ==
Adductor avulsion do not benefit from a grading system because isolated avulsion account only for 1/3rd of avulsions, as more commonly other parts of the PLAC and pectineus are injured.

Step One: Adductor longus fibrocartilage assessment

- Normal
- Complete Tear
- Partial Tear (Type 6)

Step Two: Assessment pyramidalis-adductor longus connection

- Normal
- Complete Tear
- Partial Tear

Step Three: Partial pectineus avulsion

- Yes
- No

== See also ==
- Pyramidalis muscle
- Sports medicine
- Athletic pubalgia
