= Pubic crest =

Bone in the pubic region of the human body

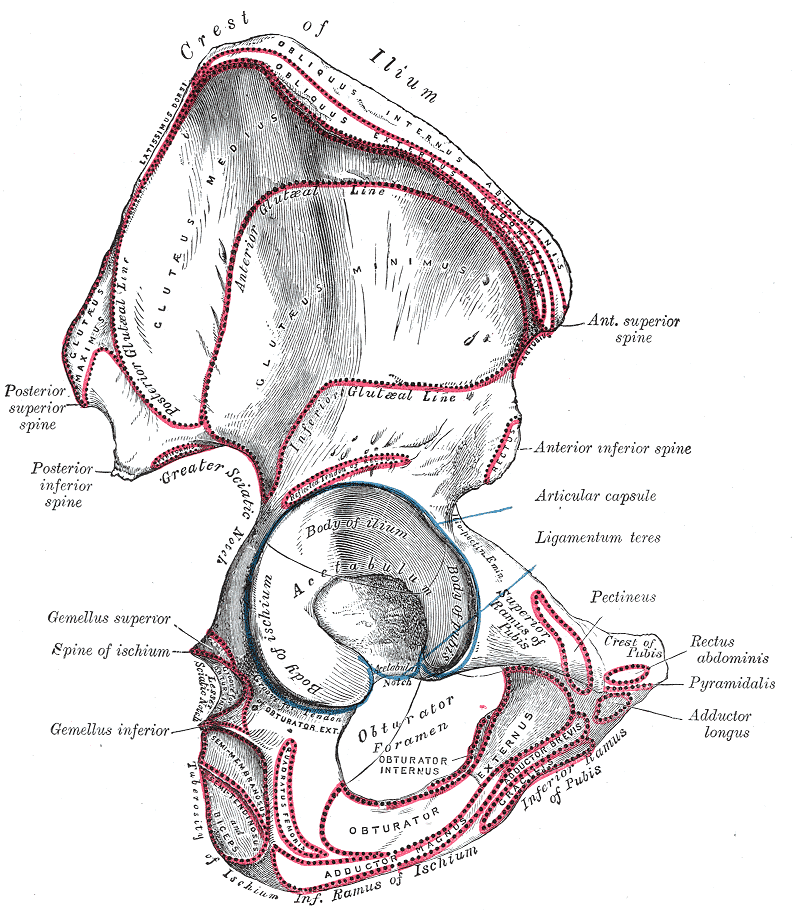
- Right hip bone. External surface. (Crest of pubis labeled at center-bottom right.)

Details

Identifiers
- Latin: crista pubica
- TA98: A02.5.01.305
- TA2: 1350
- FMA: 16952

Medial to the pubic tubercle is the pubic crest, which extends from this process to the medial end of the pubic bone.

It gives attachment to the conjoint tendon, the rectus abdominis, the abdominal external oblique muscle, and the pyramidalis muscle.

The point of junction of the crest with the medial border of the bone is called the angle; to it, as well as to the symphysis, the superior crus of the subcutaneous inguinal ring is attached.
