= Superficial epigastric artery =

Large blood vessel

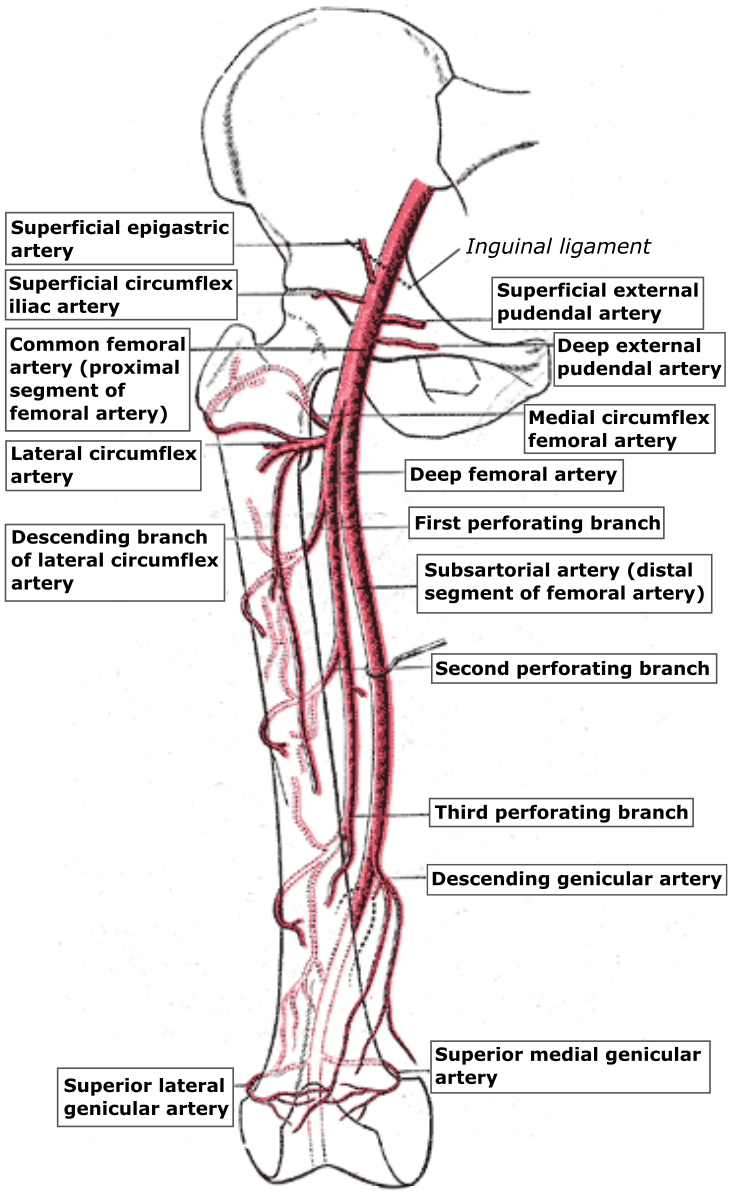
- Scheme of the femoral artery with segments and branches. (Superficial epigastric artery labeled at upper left.)

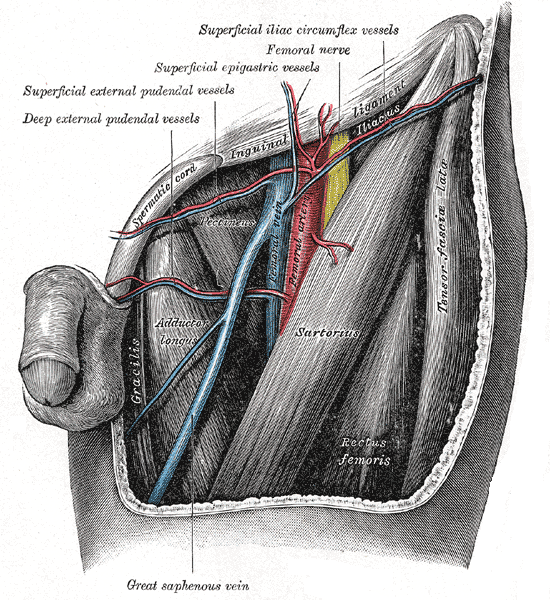
- The left femoral triangle. (Superficial epigastric vesseles labeled at center top.)

Details
- Source: Femoral artery
- Vein: Superficial epigastric vein

Identifiers
- Latin: arteria epigastrica superficialis
- MeSH: D019074
- TA98: A12.2.16.011
- TA2: 4675
- FMA: 20734

The superficial epigastric artery (not to be confused with the superior epigastric artery) arises from the front of the femoral artery about 1 cm below the inguinal ligament, and, passing through the femoral sheath and the fascia cribrosa, turns upward in front of the inguinal ligament, and ascends between the two layers of the superficial fascia of the abdominal wall nearly as far as the umbilicus.

It distributes branches to the superficial subinguinal lymph glands, the superficial fascia, and the integument; it anastomoses with branches of the inferior epigastric, and with its fellow of the opposite side.

== Additional images ==
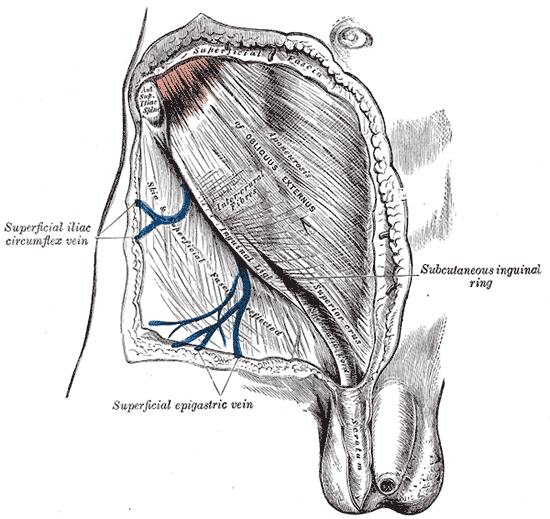
The subcutaneous inguinal ring

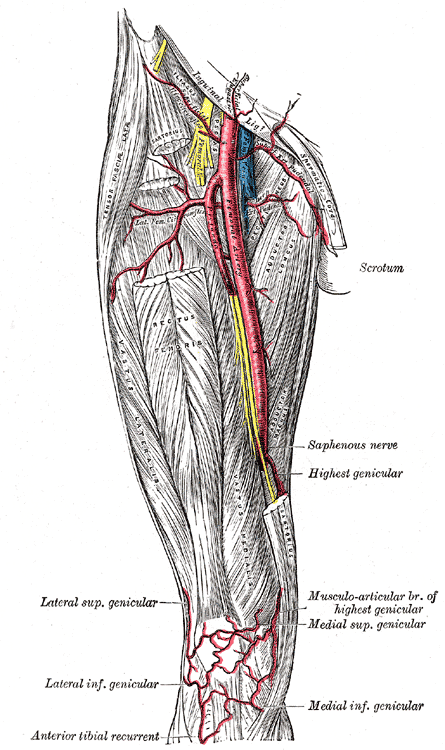
The femoral artery

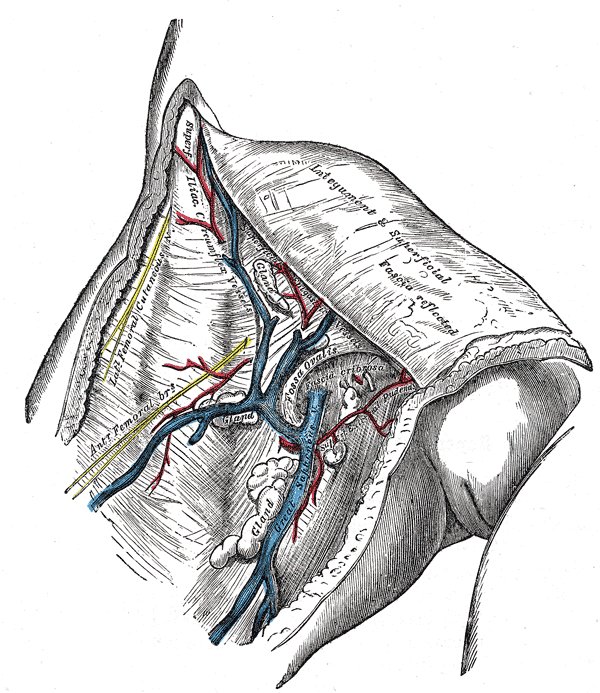
The great saphenous vein and its tributaries at the fossa ovalis

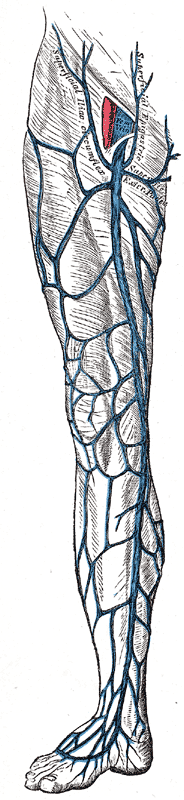
The great saphenous vein and its tributaries

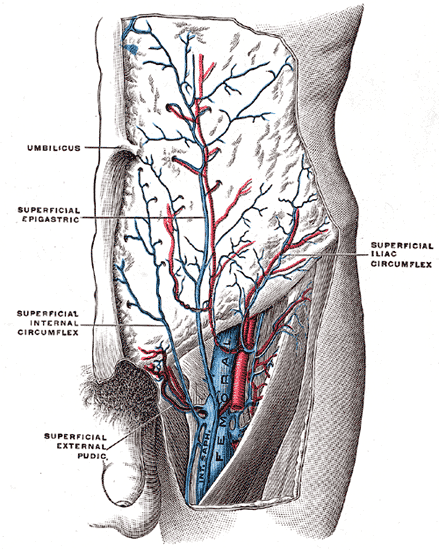
The femoral vein and its tributaries

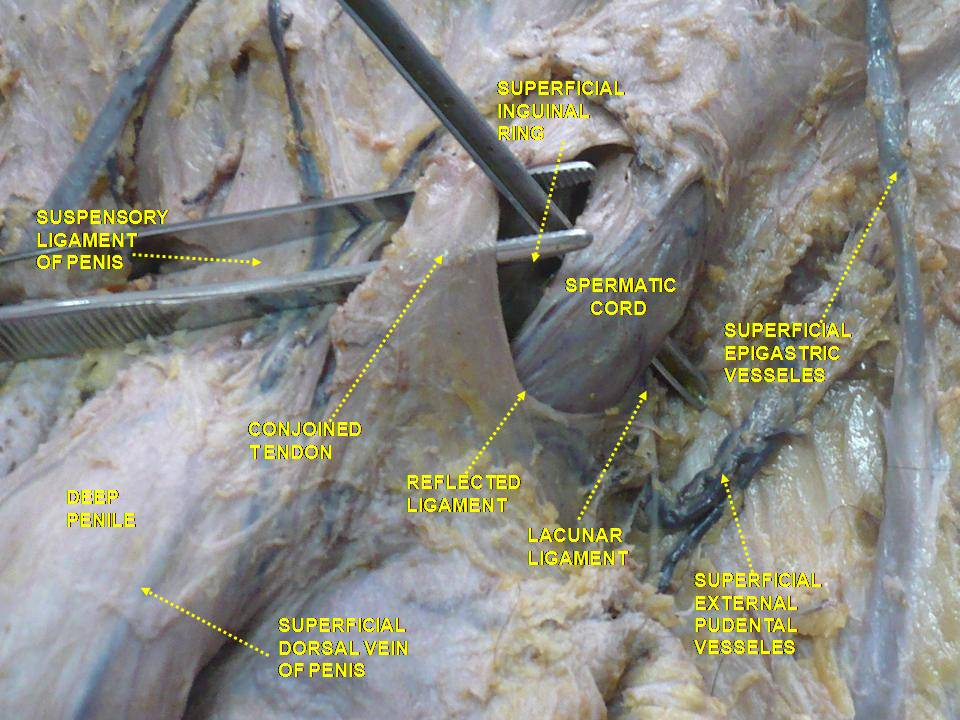
Anterior abdominal wall. Intermediate dissection. Anterior view.
