= Superior epigastric vein =

Blood vessel

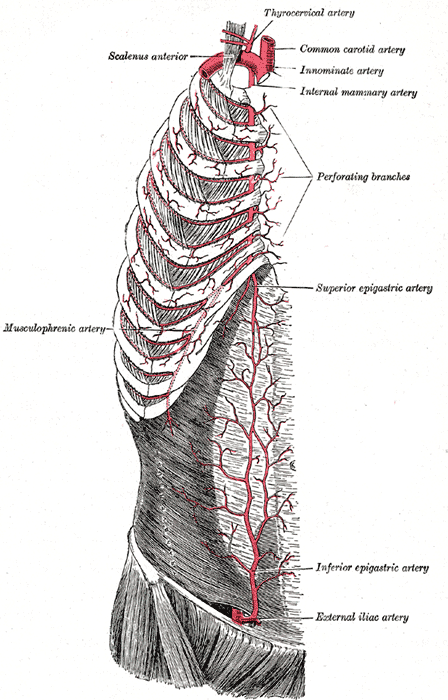
- Superior epigastric vein, runs with the superior epigastric artery (labeled at centre right)

Details
- Drains from: Abdominal wall and some of the diaphragm
- Drains to: Internal thoracic vein
- Artery: Superior epigastric artery

Identifiers
- Latin: venae epigastricae superiores
- TA98: A12.3.04.019
- TA2: 4787
- FMA: 70836

In human anatomy, the superior epigastric veins are two or more venae comitantes which accompany either superior epigastric artery before emptying into the internal thoracic vein. They participate in the drainage of the superior surface of the diaphragm.

== Structure ==
=== Course ===
The superior epigastric vein originates from the internal thoracic vein. The superior epigastric veins first run between the sternal margin and the costal margin of the diaphragm, then enter the rectus sheath. They run inferiorly, coursing superficially to the fibrous layer forming the posterior leaflet of the rectus sheath, and deep to the rectus abdominis muscle.

The superior epigastric veins are venae comitantes of the superior epigastric artery, and mirror its course.

=== Distribution ===
The superior epigastric veins participate in the drainage of the superior surface of the diaphragm.

=== Fate ===
The superior epigastric veins drain into the internal thoracic vein.

== See also ==
- Terms for anatomical location
