= Linea alba (abdomen) =

Fibrous structure of the abdomen

- Diagram of the rectus sheath.

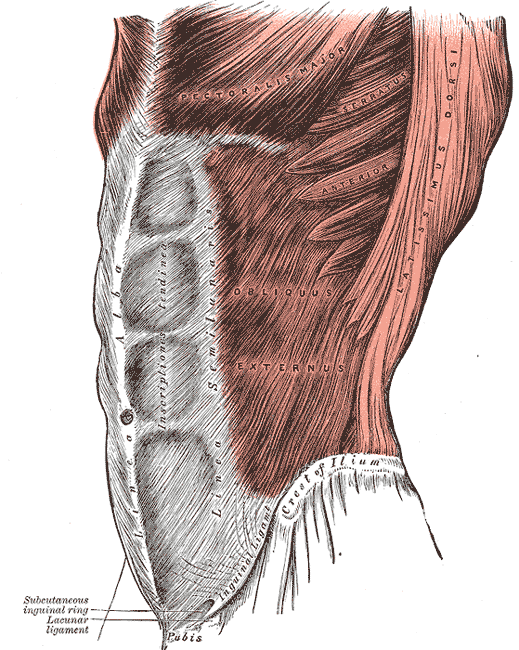
- The abdominal external oblique muscle.

Details

Identifiers
- Latin: linea alba
- TA98: A04.5.01.022
- TA2: 2377
- FMA: 11336

The linea alba (Latin for: white line) is a fibrous midline structure of the anterior abdominal wall situated between the two recti abdominis muscles (one on either side). The umbilicus (navel) is present on the linea alba through which foetal umbilical vessels pass before birth. The linea alba is formed by the union of aponeuroses (of the muscles of the anterior abdominal wall) that collectively make up the rectus sheath. The linea alba attaches to the xiphoid process superiorly, and to the pubic symphysis inferiorly. It is narrow inferiorly where the two recti abdominis muscles are in contact with each other posterior to it, and broadens superior-ward from just inferior to the umbilicus.

The name means white line as it is composed mostly of collagen connective tissue, which has a white appearance.

== Function ==
The linea alba stabilizes the anterior abdominal wall, as it balances contractile forces from the muscles attached to it.

== Clinical significance ==
An abnormal widening of the linea alba and the abdomanal wall generally is known as diastasis recti.

A median incision through the linea alba is a common surgical approach for abdominal surgery. This is because it consists of mostly connective tissue, and does not contain any primary nerves or blood vessels. The linea alba is narrower below the belly button and is hard to close (sew together), so it a common site of hernias following surgery.

In C-sections, the two rectus abdominis muscles must be separated in order to access the uterus underneath; in most C/S techniques, these are typically manually pulled apart, and thus "blunt dissection" (tearing) through the linea alba occurs. In Pfannenstiel-Kerr method sharp dissection (cutting with a scalpel) is used.

== Additional images ==
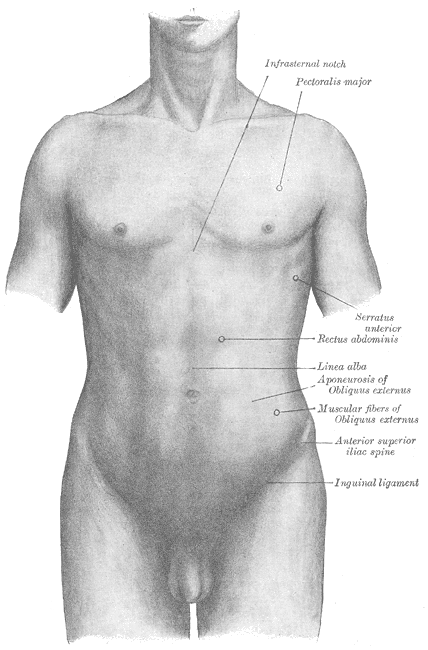
Surface anatomy of the front of the thorax and abdomen.

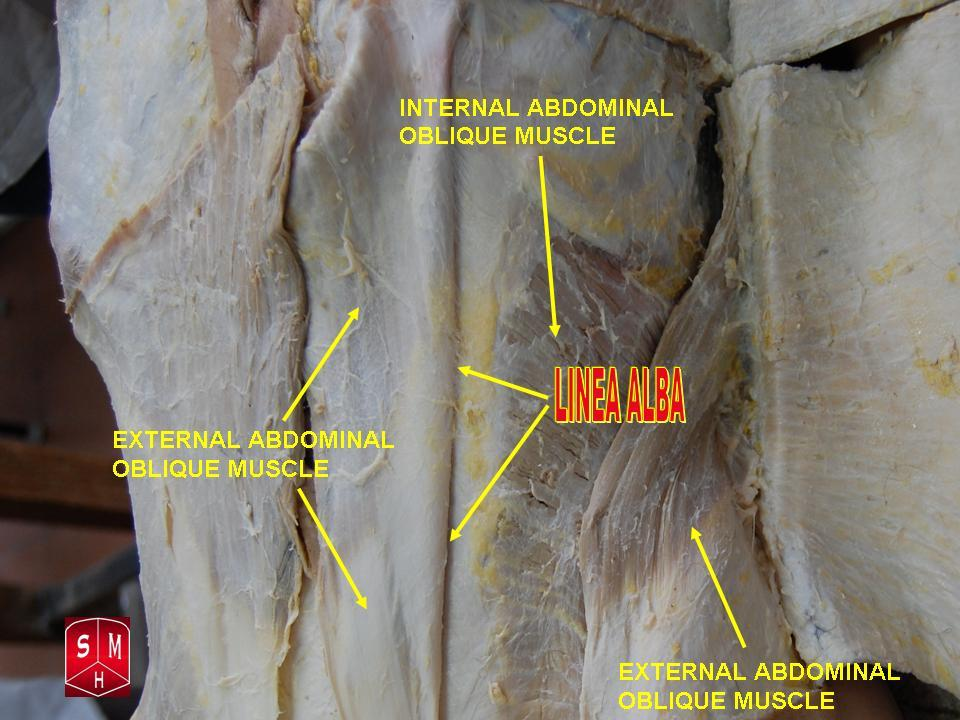
Linea alba

== See also ==
- Linea alba (cheek)
- Linea nigra
