= Inferior epigastric vein =

Large blood vessel

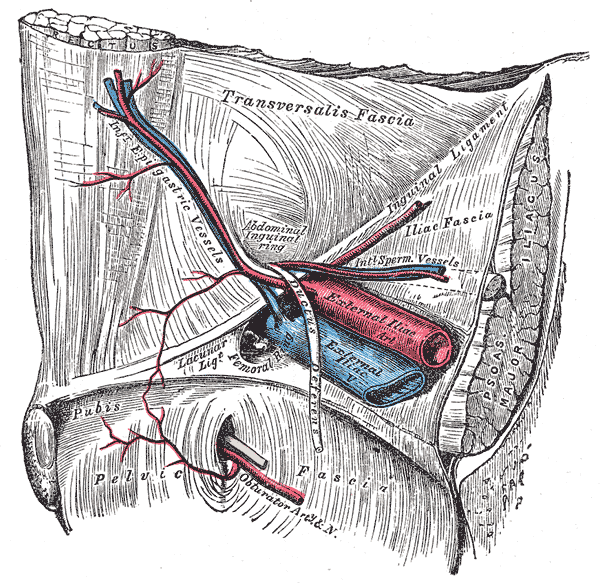
- Right inferior epigastric vein - view from inside of abdomen.

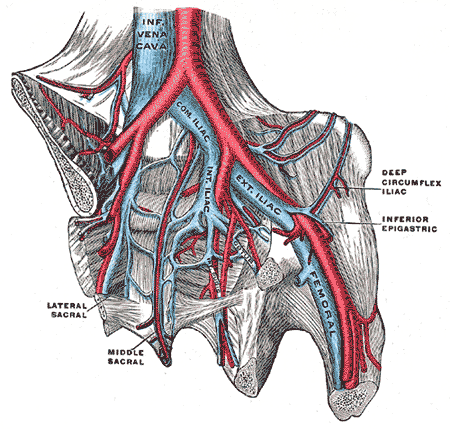
- The iliac veins.

Details
- Drains from: Superior epigastric vein
- Drains to: External iliac vein
- Artery: Inferior epigastric artery

Identifiers
- Latin: vena epigastrica inferior
- TA98: A12.3.10.025
- TA2: 5051
- FMA: 21162

In human anatomy, inferior epigastric vein are 1-2 veins accompanying the inferior epigastric artery. They drain into the external iliac vein just proximal to the inguinal ligament.

== Additional images ==
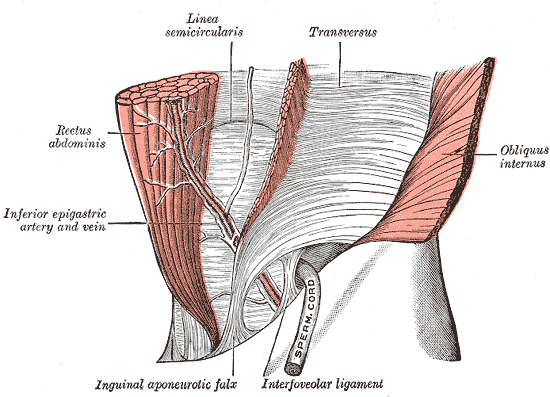
The interfoveolar ligament, seen from in front.

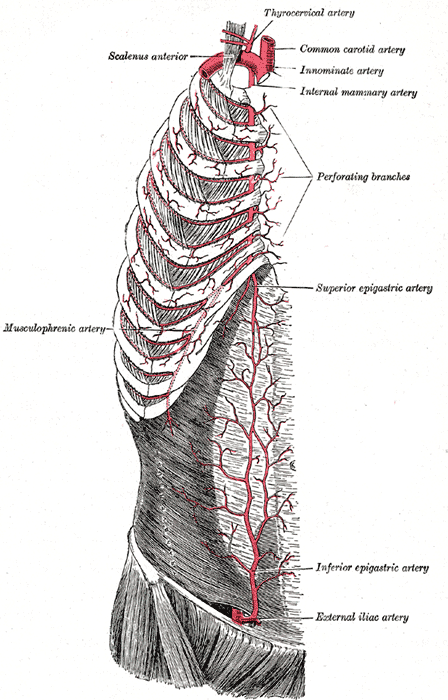
The internal mammary artery and its branches.

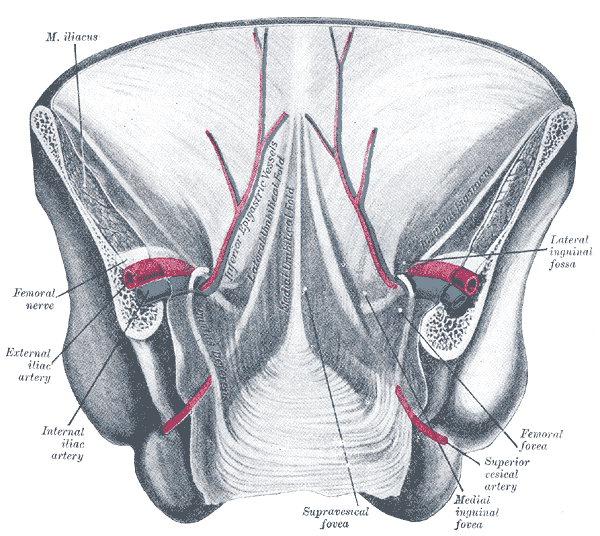
Posterior view of the anterior abdominal wall in its lower half. The peritoneum is in place, and the various cords are shining through.

== See also ==
- Terms for anatomical location
- Hesselbach's triangle
