= Superior epigastric artery =

Blood vessel

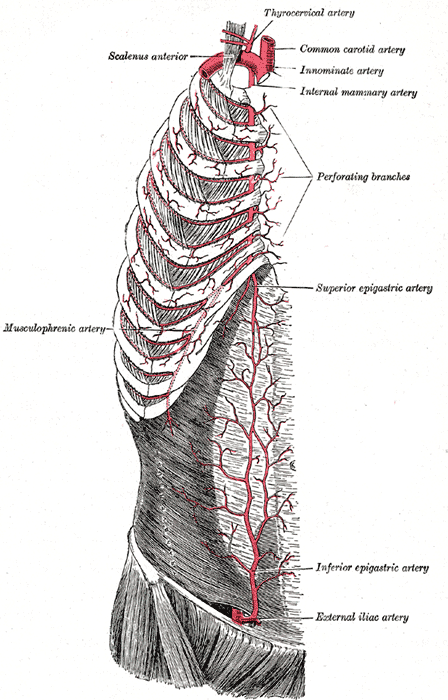
- Superior epigastric artery, internal thoracic artery and inferior epigastric artery. (Superior epigastric artery is labeled at right center.)

Details
- Source: Internal thoracic
- Vein: Superior epigastric vein

Identifiers
- Latin: arteria epigastrica superior
- TA98: A12.2.08.041
- TA2: 4588
- FMA: 10646

In human anatomy, the superior epigastric artery is a terminal branch of the internal thoracic artery that provides arterial supply to the abdominal wall, and upper rectus abdominis muscle. It enters the rectus sheath to descend upon the inner surface of the rectus abdominis muscle. It ends by anastomosing with the inferior epigastric artery.

== Structure ==
=== Origin ===
The superior epigastric artery arises from the internal thoracic artery (referred to as the internal mammary artery in the accompanying diagram).

=== Course and relations ===
The superior epigastric artery pierces the diaphragm through the foramen of Morgagni so as to enter the rectus sheath and descend upon the deep surface of the rectus abdominis.

Along its course, it is accompanied by a similarly named vein, the superior epigastric vein.

=== Anastomoses ===
It anastomoses with the inferior epigastric artery within the rectus abdominis muscle at the umbilicus.

=== Distribution ===
Where it anastomoses, the superior epigastric artery supplies the anterior part of the abdominal wall, upper rectus abdominis muscle, and some of the diaphragm.

== Collateralization in disease ==
=== Vascular disease ===
The superior epigastric arteries, inferior epigastric arteries, internal thoracic arteries and left subclavian artery and right subclavian artery / brachiocephalic are collateral vessels to the thoracic aorta and abdominal aorta. If the abdominal aorta develops a significant stenosis and/or blockage (as may be caused by atherosclerosis), this collateral pathway may develop sufficiently, over time, to supply blood to the lower limbs.

=== Coarctation of the aorta ===
A congenitally narrowed aorta, due to coarctation, is often associated with a significant enlargement of the internal thoracic and epigastric arteries.

== See also ==
- Terms for anatomical location
- Inferior epigastric artery
