= Inferior epigastric artery =

Blood vessel

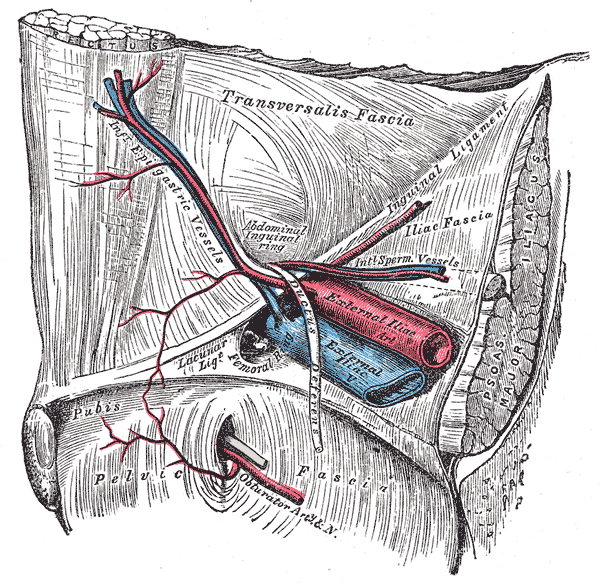
- Right inferior epigastric artery - view from inside of abdomen. (Inferior epigastric vessels labeled at upper left.)

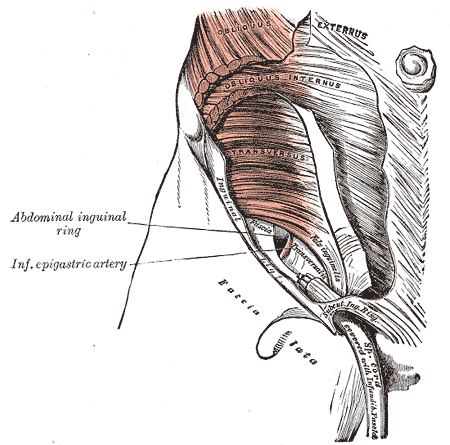
- The abdominal inguinal ring. (Inf. epigastric artery labeled at center left.)

Details
- Source: External iliac artery
- Branches: Cremasteric artery, pubic branch of inferior epigastric artery, artery of round ligament of uterus ♀
- Vein: Inferior epigastric vein

Identifiers
- Latin: arteria epigastrica inferior
- TA98: A12.2.16.003
- TA2: 4358
- FMA: 20686

In human anatomy, the inferior epigastric artery is an artery that arises from the external iliac artery. It is accompanied by the inferior epigastric vein; inferiorly, these two inferior epigastric vessels together travel within the lateral umbilical fold (which represents the lateral border of Hesselbach's triangle, the area through which direct inguinal hernias protrude.) The inferior epigastric artery then traverses the arcuate line of rectus sheath to enter the rectus sheath, then anastomoses with the superior epigastric artery within the rectus sheath.

== Structure ==
=== Origin ===
The inferior epigastric artery arises from the external iliac artery, immediately superior to the inguinal ligament.

=== Course and relations ===
It curves forward in the subperitoneal tissue, and then ascends obliquely along the medial margin of the abdominal inguinal ring; continuing its course upward, it pierces the transversalis fascia, and, passing in front of the linea semicircularis, ascends between the rectus abdominis muscle and the posterior lamella of its sheath.

It finally divides into numerous branches, which anastomose, above the umbilicus, with the superior epigastric branch of the internal thoracic artery and with the lower intercostal arteries.

As the inferior epigastric artery passes obliquely upward from its origin it lies along the lower and medial margins of the abdominal inguinal ring, and behind the commencement of the spermatic cord.

The vas deferens, as it leaves the spermatic cord in the male, and the round ligament of the uterus in the female, winds around the lateral and posterior aspects of the artery.

=== Anastomoses ===
It anastomoses with the superior epigastric artery.

== Clinical significance ==
=== Hernia ===
The inferior epigastric artery may lie close to an inguinal hernia, so acts as a useful landmark.

=== Surgery ===
The inferior epigastric artery may be damaged during laparoscopic surgery. It may also be damaged when manually finding the peritoneum beneath the rectus abdominis muscle.

== Additional images ==
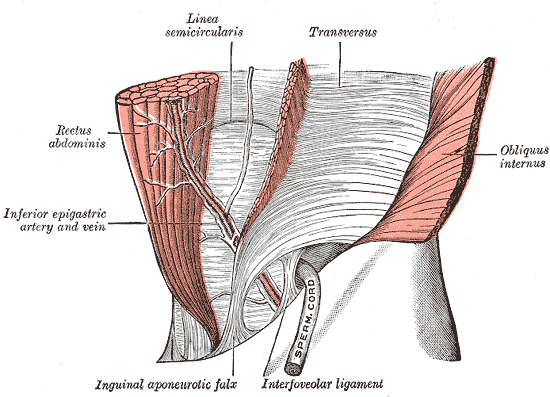
The interfoveolar ligament, seen from in front.

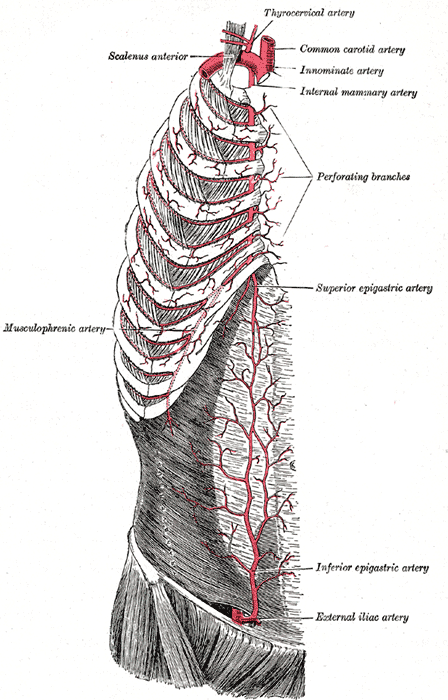
The internal mammary artery and its branches.

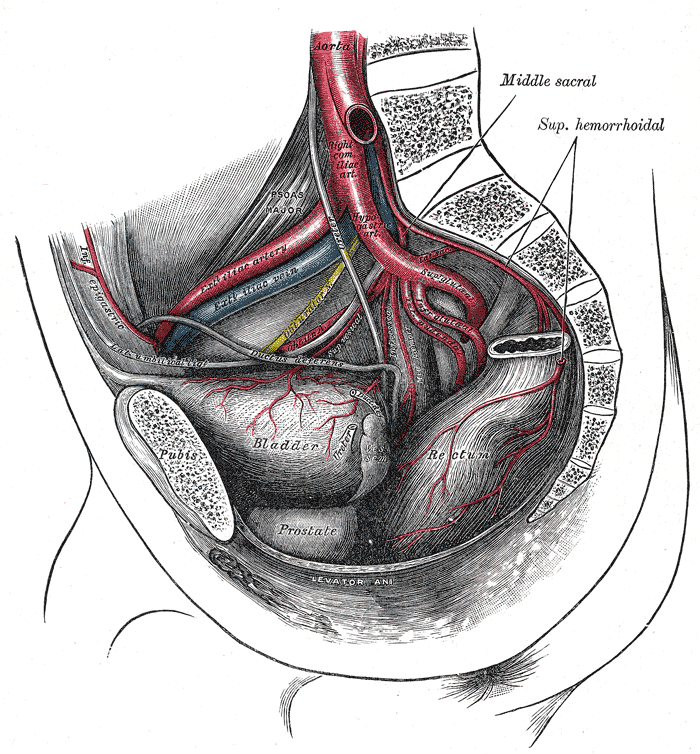
The arteries of the pelvis.

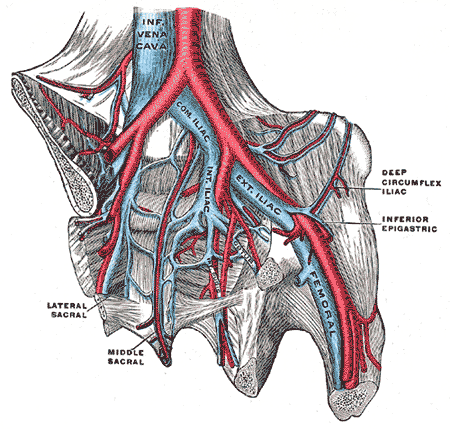
The iliac veins.

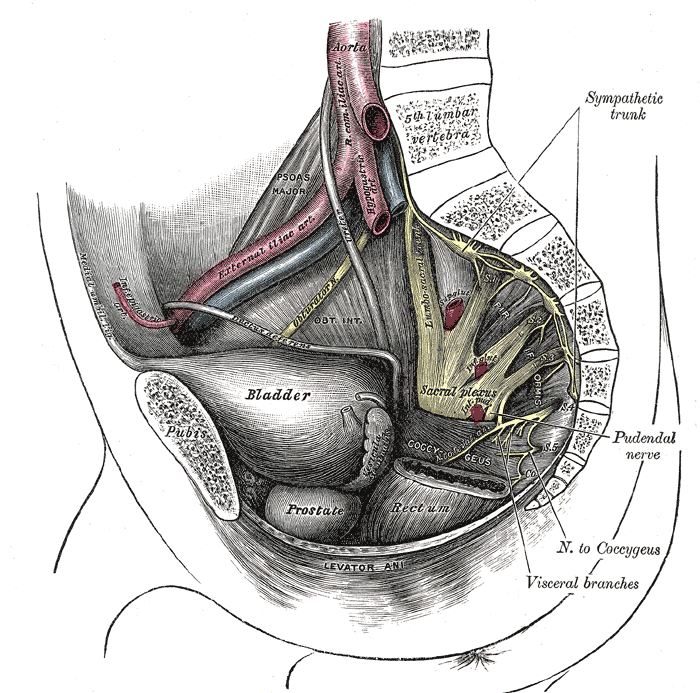
Dissection of side wall of pelvis showing sacral and pudendal plexuses.

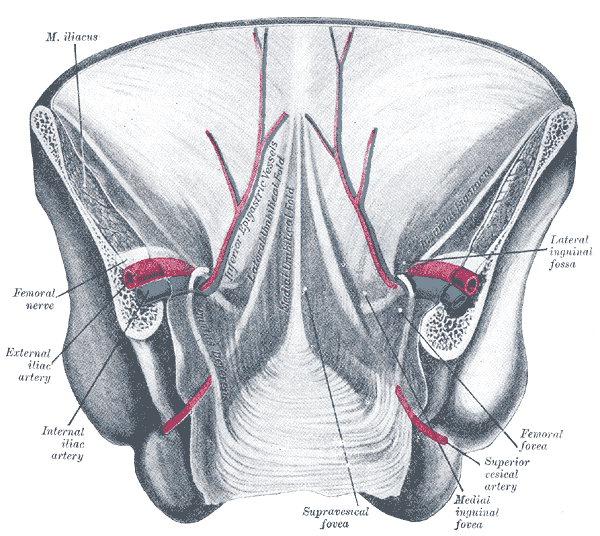
Posterior view of the anterior abdominal wall in its lower half. The peritoneum is in place, and the various cords are shining through.

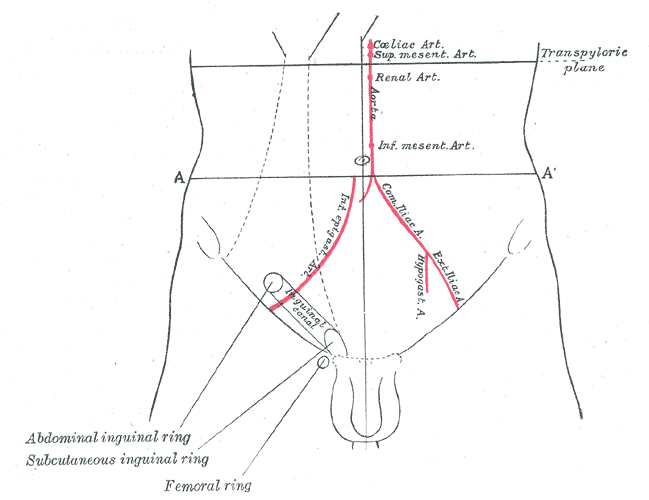
Front of abdomen, showing surface markings for arteries and inguinal canal.

Schema of the arteries arising from the external iliac and femoral arteries.

== See also ==
- Terms for anatomical location
- Hesselbach's triangle
