= Rectus abdominis muscle =

Paired straight muscle

Rectus abdominis
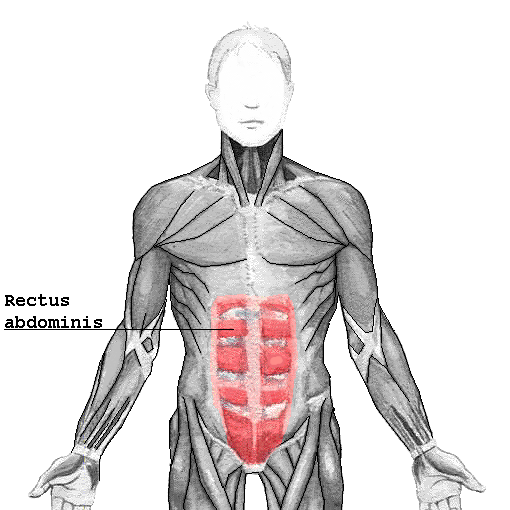
- The human rectus abdominis muscle.

Details
- Origin: Crest of pubic
- Insertion: Costal cartilages of ribs 5-7 xiphoid process of sternum
- Artery: Inferior epigastric artery
- Nerve: Segmentally by thoraco-abdominal nerves (T7 to T11) and subcostal (T12)
- Actions: Flexion of the lumbar spine
- Antagonist: Erector spinae

Identifiers
- Latin: musculus rectus abdominis
- MeSH: D017568
- TA98: A04.5.01.001
- TA2: 2357
- FMA: 9628

The rectus abdominis, (Latin: straight abdominal) also known as the "abdominal muscle" or simply better known as the "abs", and sometimes informally referred to as the "six-pack", is a pair of segmented skeletal muscle on the ventral aspect of a person's abdomen. The paired muscle is separated at the midline by a band of dense connective tissue called the linea alba, and the connective tissue defining each lateral margin of the rectus abdominus is the linea semilunaris. The muscle extends from the pubic symphysis, pubic crest and pubic tubercle inferiorly, to the xiphoid process and costal cartilages of the 5th–7th ribs superiorly.

The rectus abdominis muscle is contained in the rectus sheath, which consists of the aponeuroses of the lateral abdominal muscles. Each rectus abdominus is traversed by bands of connective tissue called the tendinous intersections, which interrupt it into distinct muscle bellies.

== Structure ==
The rectus abdominis is a very long flat muscle, which extends along the whole length of the front of the abdomen, and is separated from its fellow of the opposite side by the linea alba. Tendinous intersections (intersectiones tendineae) further subdivide each rectus abdominis muscle into a series of smaller muscle bellies. Tensing of the rectus abdominis causes the muscle to expand between each tendinous intersection.

The upper portion, attached principally to the cartilage of the fifth rib, usually has some fibers of insertion into the anterior extremity of the rib itself.

=== Size ===
It is typically around 10 mm thick, although, some athletes can have a rectus up to 20 mm thick. Typical volume is around 300 cm^{3} in non-active individuals and 500 cm^{3} in athletes.

=== Blood supply ===
The rectus abdominis has many sources of arterial blood supply. Classification of the vascular anatomy of muscles: First, the inferior epigastric artery and vein (or veins) run superiorly on the posterior surface of the rectus abdominis, enter the rectus fascia at the arcuate line, and serve the lower part of the muscle. Second, the superior epigastric artery, a terminal branch of the internal thoracic artery, supplies blood to the upper portion. Finally, numerous small segmental contributions come from the lower six intercostal arteries as well.

=== Nerve supply ===
The muscles are innervated by thoraco-abdominal nerves, these are continuations of the T7-T11 intercostal nerves and pierce the anterior layer of the rectus sheath. Sensory supply is from the 7-12 thoracic nerves.

=== Variation ===
The sternalis muscle may be a variant form of the pectoralis major or the rectus abdominis. Some fibers are occasionally connected with the costoxiphoid ligaments, and the side of the xiphoid process.

== Function ==
The rectus abdominis is an important postural muscle. It is responsible for flexing the lumbar spine, as when doing a crunch. The rib cage is brought up to where the pelvis is when the pelvis is fixed, or the pelvis can be brought towards the rib cage (posterior pelvic tilt) when the rib cage is fixed, such as in a leg-hip raise. The two can also be brought together simultaneously when neither is fixed in space.

The rectus abdominis assists with breathing and plays an important role in respiration when forcefully exhaling, as seen after exercise as well as in conditions where exhalation is difficult such as emphysema. It also helps in keeping the internal organs intact and in creating intra-abdominal pressure, such as when exercising or lifting heavy weights, during forceful defecation or parturition (childbirth).

== Clinical significance ==
An abdominal muscle strain, also called a pulled abdominal muscle, is an injury to one of the muscles of the abdominal wall. A muscle strain occurs when the muscle is stretched too far. When this occurs the muscle fibers are torn. Most commonly, a strain causes microscopic tears within the muscle, but occasionally, in severe injuries, the muscle can rupture from its attachment.

A rectus sheath hematoma is an accumulation of blood in the sheath of the rectus abdominis muscle. It causes abdominal pain with or without a mass. The hematoma may be caused by either rupture of the epigastric artery or by a muscular tear. Causes of this include anticoagulation, coughing, pregnancy, abdominal surgery and trauma. With an ageing population and the widespread use of anticoagulant medications, there is evidence that this historically benign condition is becoming more common and more serious.

On abdominal examination, people may have a positive Carnett's sign.

Most hematomas resolve without treatment, but they may take several months to resolve.

== Other animals ==
The rectus abdominis is similar in most vertebrates. The most obvious difference between animal and human abdominal musculature is that in animals, there are a different number of tendinous intersections.

== Additional images ==
Diagram of sheath of rectus abdominis

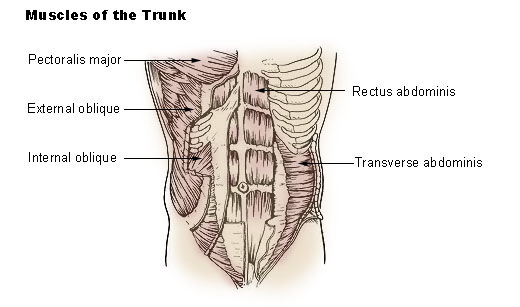
Muscles of the trunk

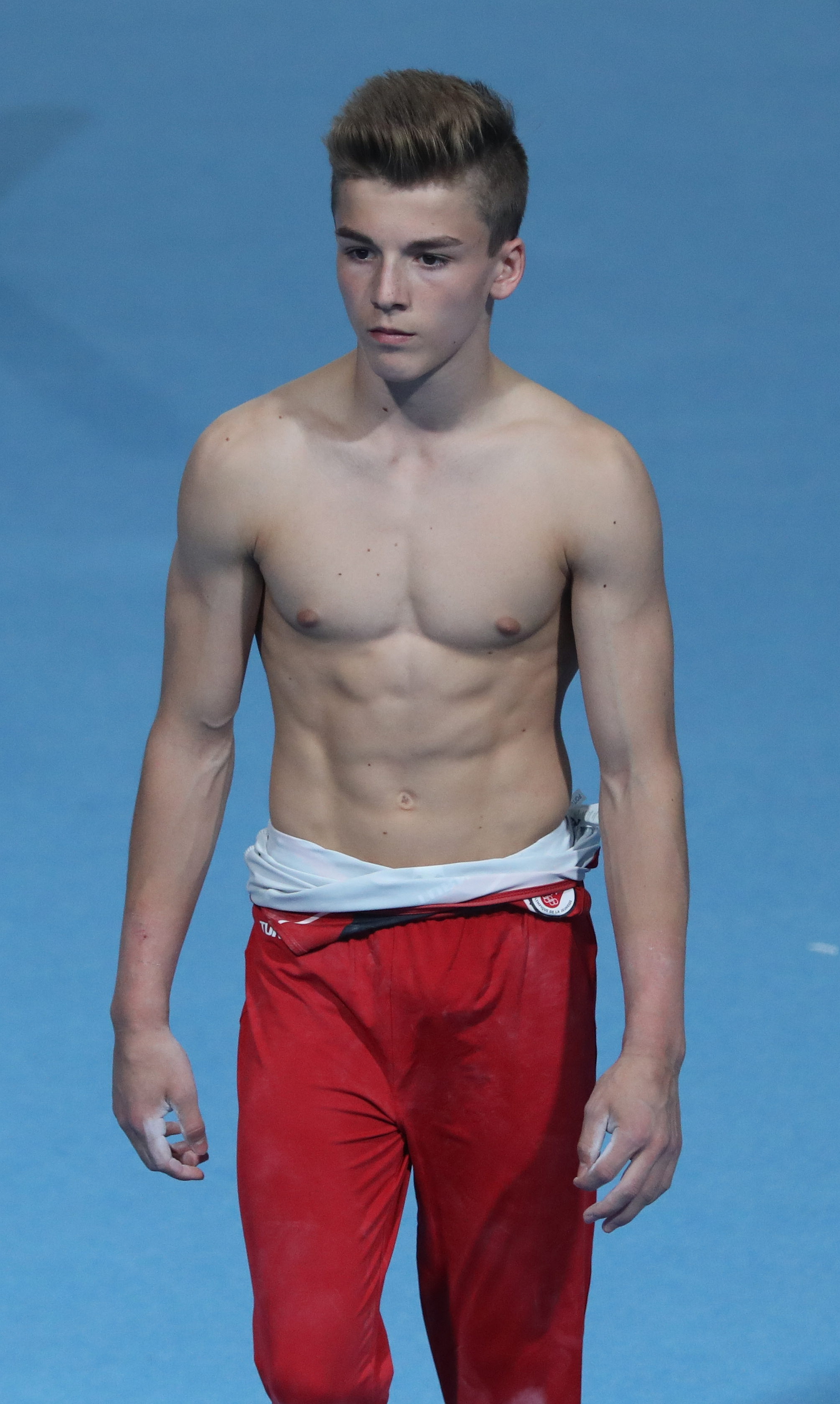
Male athlete with a visible rectus abdominis

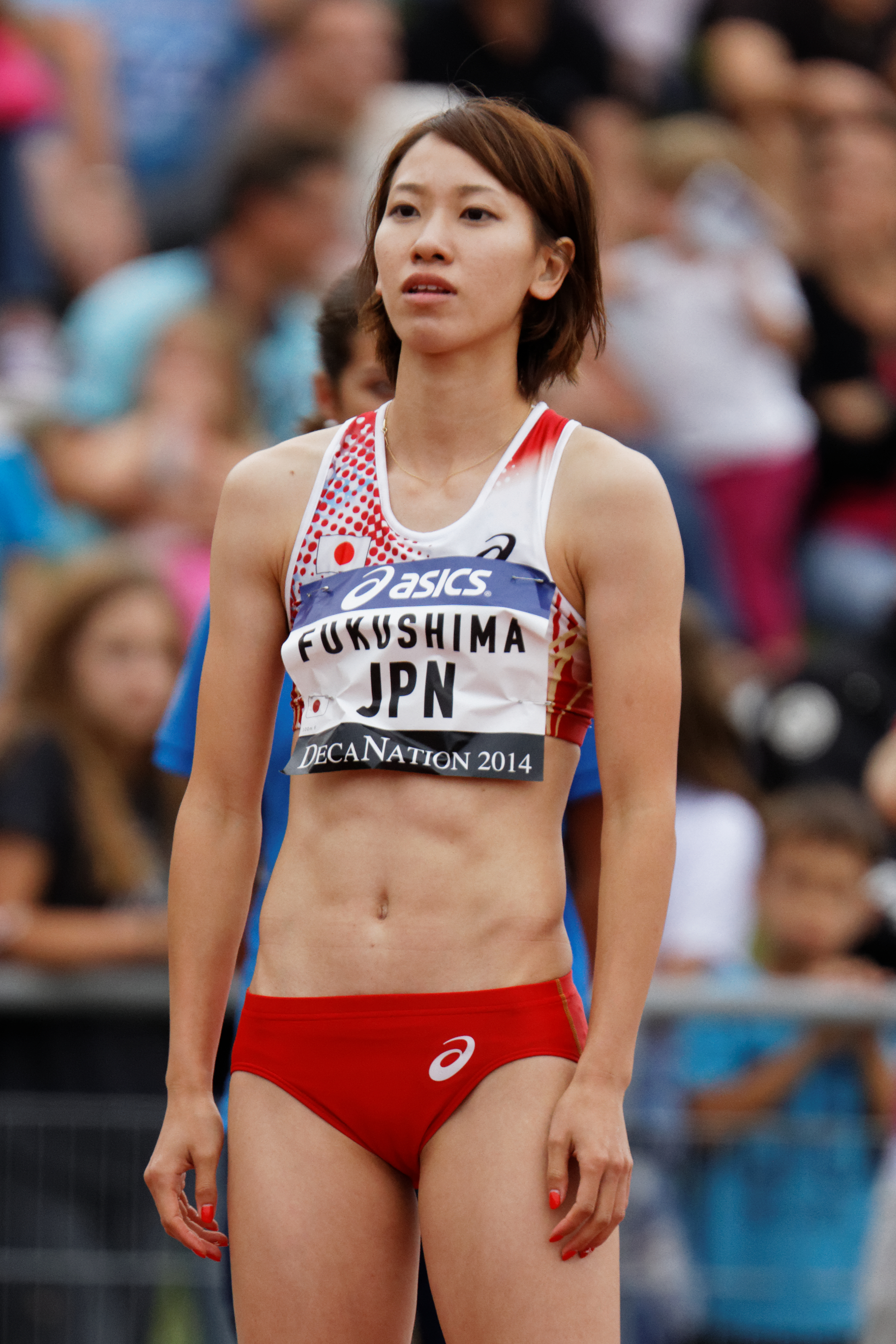
Female athlete with a visible rectus abdominis

== See also ==
- Diastasis recti
