= Superficial epigastric vein =

Large blood vessel

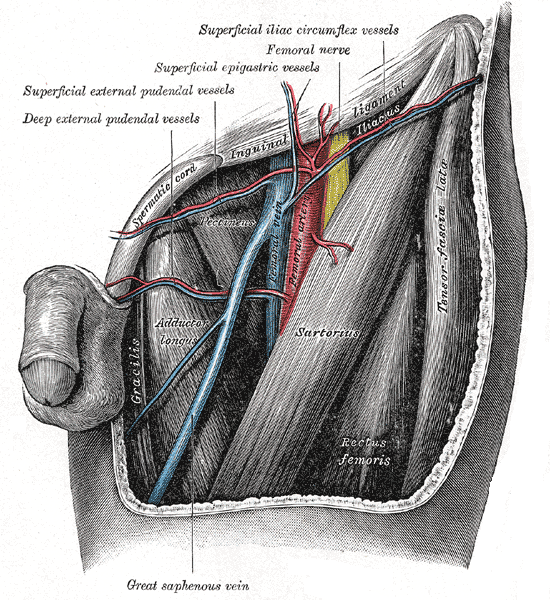
- The left femoral triangle. (Superior epigastric vesseles labeled at center top.)

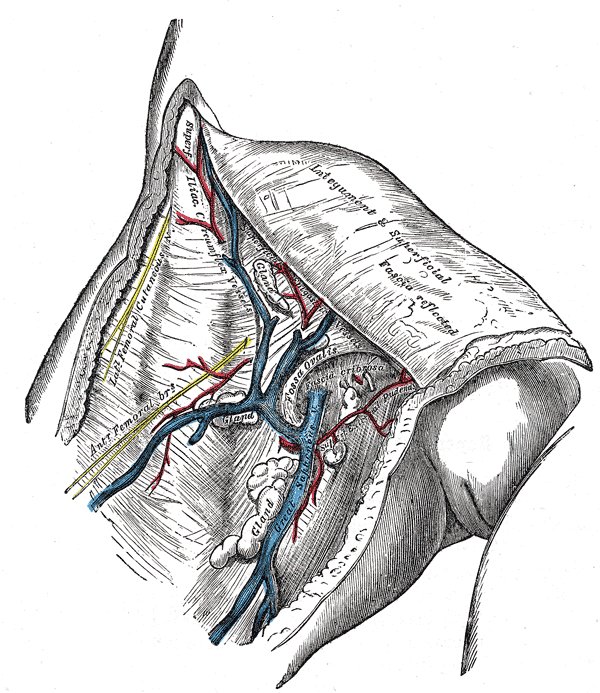
- The great saphenous vein and its tributaries at the fossa ovalis

Details
- Drains to: Great saphenous vein femoral vein
- Artery: Superficial epigastric artery

Identifiers
- Latin: vena epigastrica superficialis
- TA98: A12.3.11.006
- TA2: 5067
- FMA: 44318

The superficial epigastric vein is a vein which travels with the superficial epigastric artery. It joins the accessory saphenous vein near the fossa ovalis.

== Additional images ==
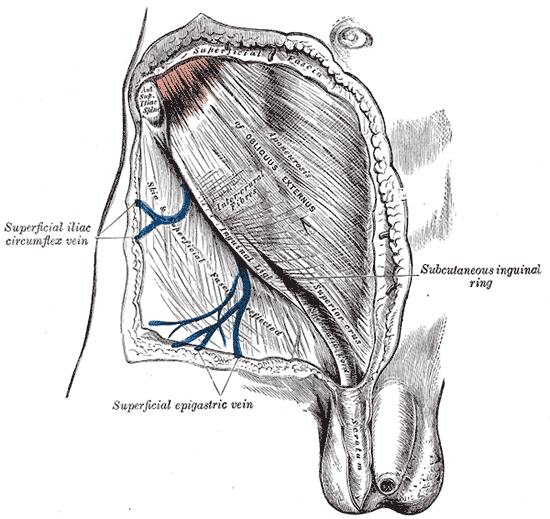
The subcutaneous inguinal ring

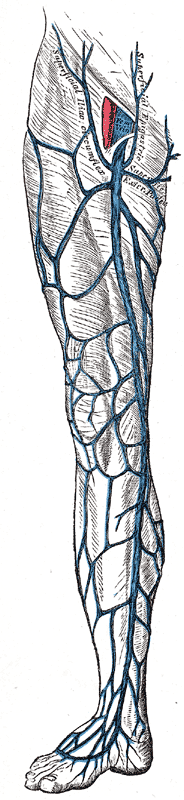
The great saphenous vein and its tributaries

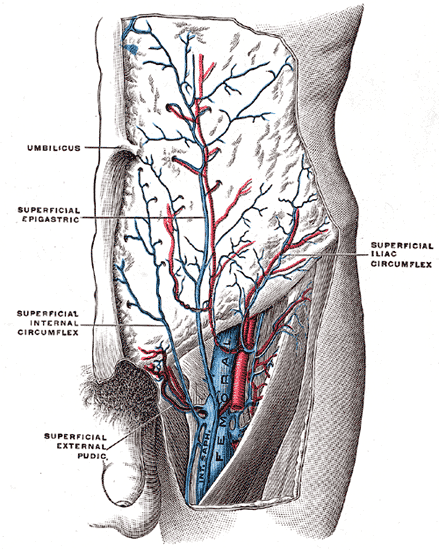
The femoral vein and its tributaries

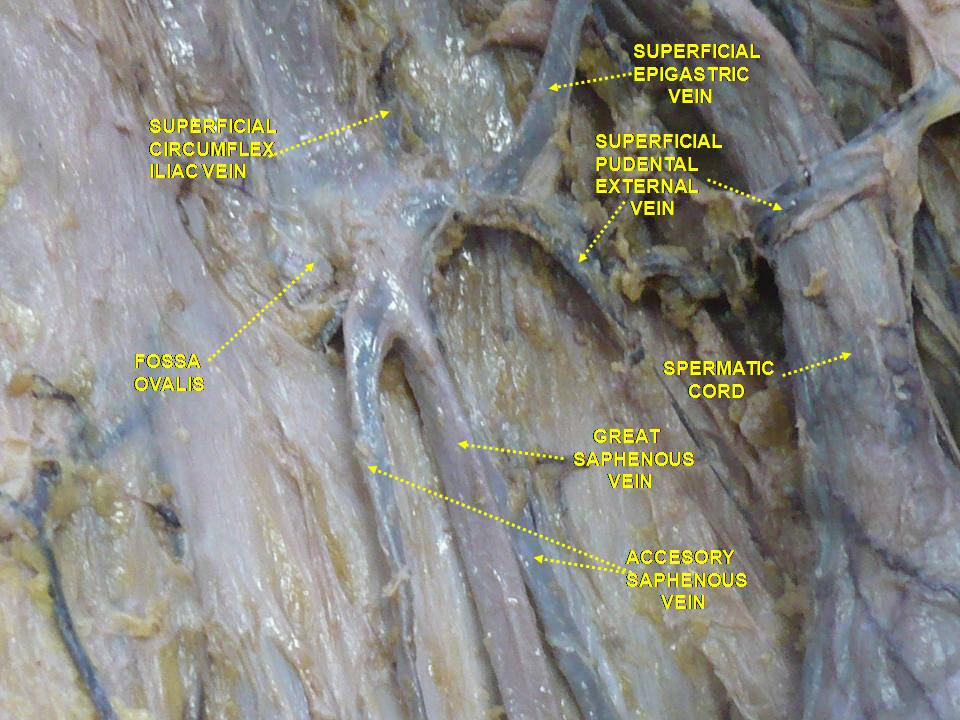
Superficial veins of lower limb. Superficial dissection. Anterior view.
