= Rectus sheath =

Laminas around abdominal muscles

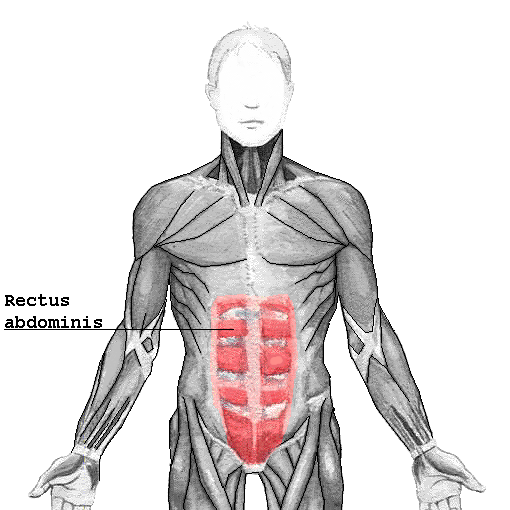

Details

Identifiers
- Latin: vagina musculi recti abdominis
- TA98: A04.5.01.003
- TA2: 2359
- FMA: 9587

The rectus sheath (also called the rectus fascia) is a tough fibrous compartment formed by the aponeuroses of the transverse abdominal muscle, and the internal and external oblique muscles. It contains the rectus abdominis and pyramidalis muscles, as well as vessels and nerves.

== Structure ==
The rectus sheath extends between the inferior costal margin and costal cartilages of ribs 5-7 superiorly, and the pubic crest inferiorly.

Studies indicate that all three aponeuroses constituting the rectus sheath are in fact bilaminar.

=== Below the costal margin ===
Region	Illustration	Description
Above the arcuate line		At the lateral border of the rectus abdominis muscle, the aponeurosis of the internal oblique muscle splits into an anterior layer and a posterior layer (this splitting forms a shallow groove - the semilunar line).: An anterior rectus sheath composed of the aponeurosis of the external oblique muscle and anterior portion of the aponeurosis of the internal oblique muscle passes in front of the rectus abdominis muscle.; A posterior rectus sheath composed of the posterior portion of the aponeurosis of the internal oblique muscle and the aponeurosis of the transversus abdominis passes behind the rectus abdominis muscle.; All aponeuroses of the rectus sheath unite at (and decussate across) the midline, forming the linea alba.
Below the arcuate line		Below this level, the aponeuroses of all three muscles (including the transversus) pass in front of the rectus. The posterior layer of the rectus sheath is thus absent and the rectus abdominis muscle is separated from the peritoneum only by the transversalis fascia. Due to this reason, this region is more susceptible to herniation.

Superficial/anterior to the anterior layer of the rectus sheath are the following two layers:

1. Camper's fascia (anterior part of superficial fascia)
2. Scarpa's fascia (posterior part of the superficial fascia)

Deep/posterior posterior layer of the rectus sheath (where present) are the following three layers:

1. transversalis fascia
2. extraperitoneal fat
3. parietal peritoneum

=== Above the costal margin ===
Since the tendons of the internal oblique and transversus abdominis only reach as high as the costal margin, it follows that above this level the sheath of the rectus is deficient behind, the muscle resting directly on the cartilages of the ribs, and being covered only by the tendons of the external obliques.

== Clinical significance ==
The rectus sheath is a useful attachment for surgical meshes during abdominal surgery. This has a higher risk of infection than many other attachment sites.

== Additional images ==
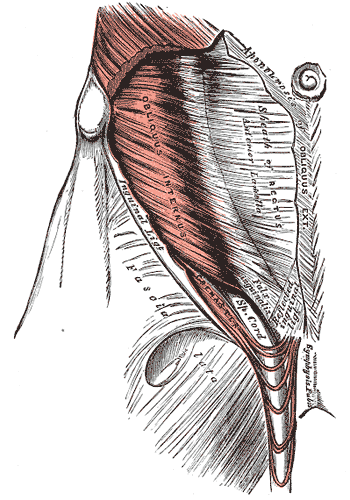
The Cremaster

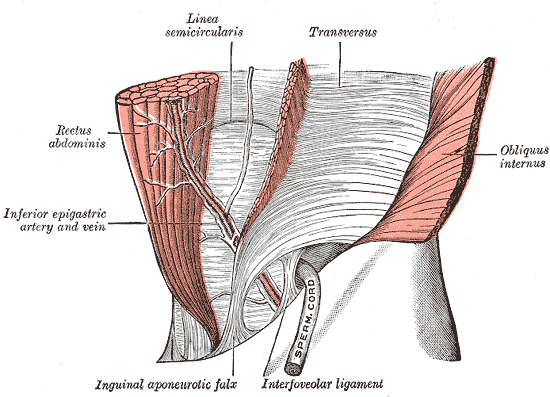
The interfoveolar ligament, seen from in front.
