= Hesselbach =

Hesselbach can refer to:

== People ==
- Franz Kaspar Hesselbach (1759-1816), German surgeon and anatomist
- Adam Kaspar Hesselbach (1788-1856), German surgeon and anatomist
- Jürgen Hesselbach, German professor and president of the Technical University of Braunschweig

== Places in Germany ==
- Hesselbach, Bad Laasphe, in North Rhine-Westphalia
