= 1830 in science =

The year 1830 in science and technology involved some significant events, listed below.

== Astronomy ==
- March 16 – Great Comet of 1830 (C/1830 F1, 1830 I) first observed from Mauritius.
- Johann Heinrich Mädler and Wilhelm Beer produce the first map of the surface of Mars.

== Biology ==
- Charles Bell publishes his Nervous System of the Human Body.
- Johannes Peter Müller publishes his Bildungsgeschichte der Genitalien in which he traces the development of the paramesonephric duct.
- William Jackson Hooker commences publication of The British Flora.

== Exploration ==
- October 14 – HMS Beagle returns to England from her first voyage, a hydrographic survey of the Patagonia and Tierra del Fuego regions of South America.
- Southern Ocean Expedition – John Biscoe sets out from England on an expedition to find new seal-hunting grounds in the Southern Ocean.

== Geology ==
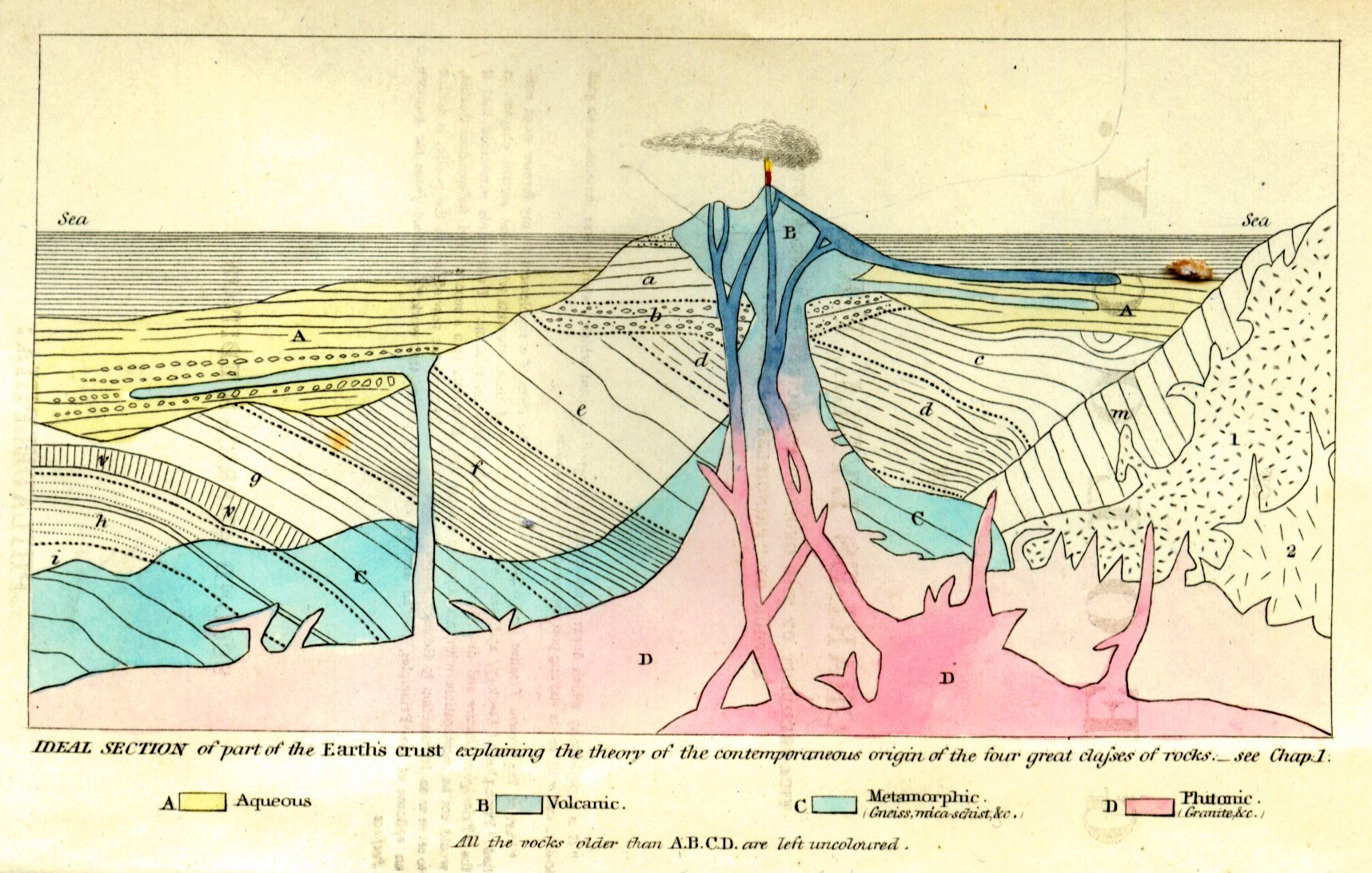
Frontispiece of Lyell's Principles of Geology

- Charles Lyell publishes the first volume of his Principles of Geology, being an attempt to explain the former changes of the Earth's surface, by reference to causes now in operation.

== Medicine ==
- Thomas Southwood Smith publishes the standard textbook A Treatise on Fever in London.
- Approximate date – The chain osteotome, a form of chainsaw, is invented by German orthopaedist Bernhard Heine.

== Technology ==
- July 13 – John Ruggles is granted United States patent No. 1, for applying rack railway equipment to the "Locomotive steam-engine for rail and other roads".
- July 17 – Barthélemy Thimonnier is granted a French patent (#7454) for a sewing machine: it chain stitches at 200/minute.
- August 31 – Edwin Budding is granted a United Kingdom patent for the lawnmower.
- October 20 – Thomas Cochrane is granted a patent for the first airlock.
- Aeneas Coffey is granted a United Kingdom patent for an improved column still.
- Eaton Hodgkinson publishes his pioneering paper on the optimum cross section for cast iron structural beams.
- Stephen H. Long designs the Long truss wooden bridge.

== Veterinary medicine ==
- Sheep dip is invented by George Wilson of Coldstream, Scotland.

== Institutions ==
- Geographical Society of London established.

== Publications ==
- Charles Babbage publishes Reflections on the Decline of Science in England, and on Some of Its Causes.
- Auguste Comte begins publication of his Course of Positive Philosophy (Cours de Philosophie Positive).

== Awards ==
- Copley Medal: not awarded

== Births ==
- March 5 – Étienne-Jules Marey (died 1904), French physiologist.
- March 5 – Charles Wyville Thomson (died 1882), Scottish marine biologist.
- April 21 – Clémence Royer (died 1902), French anthropologist.
- May 10 – François-Marie Raoult (died 1901), French chemist.
- May 11 (April 29 O.S.) – Emanoil Bacaloglu (died 1891), Romanian polymath.
- August 19 – Lothar Meyer (died 1895), German chemist.
- September 7 – Mary Treat (died 1923), American naturalist.
- October 24 – Marianne North (died 1890), English botanist.
- November 20 – Sigismond Jaccoud (died 1913), Swiss physician.

== Deaths ==
- March 2 – Samuel Thomas von Sömmerring (born 1755), German physician, anatomist, paleontologist and inventor.
- March 29 – James Rennell (born 1742), English cartographer and oceanographer.
- May 16 – Joseph Fourier (born 1768), French mathematician.
- August 24 – Louis Pierre Vieillot (born 1748), French ornithologist.
- Clelia Durazzo Grimaldi (born 1760), Italian botanist.
