= Friedrich Tiedemann =

German zoologist (1781–1861)

Friedrich Tiedemann FRS HFRSE
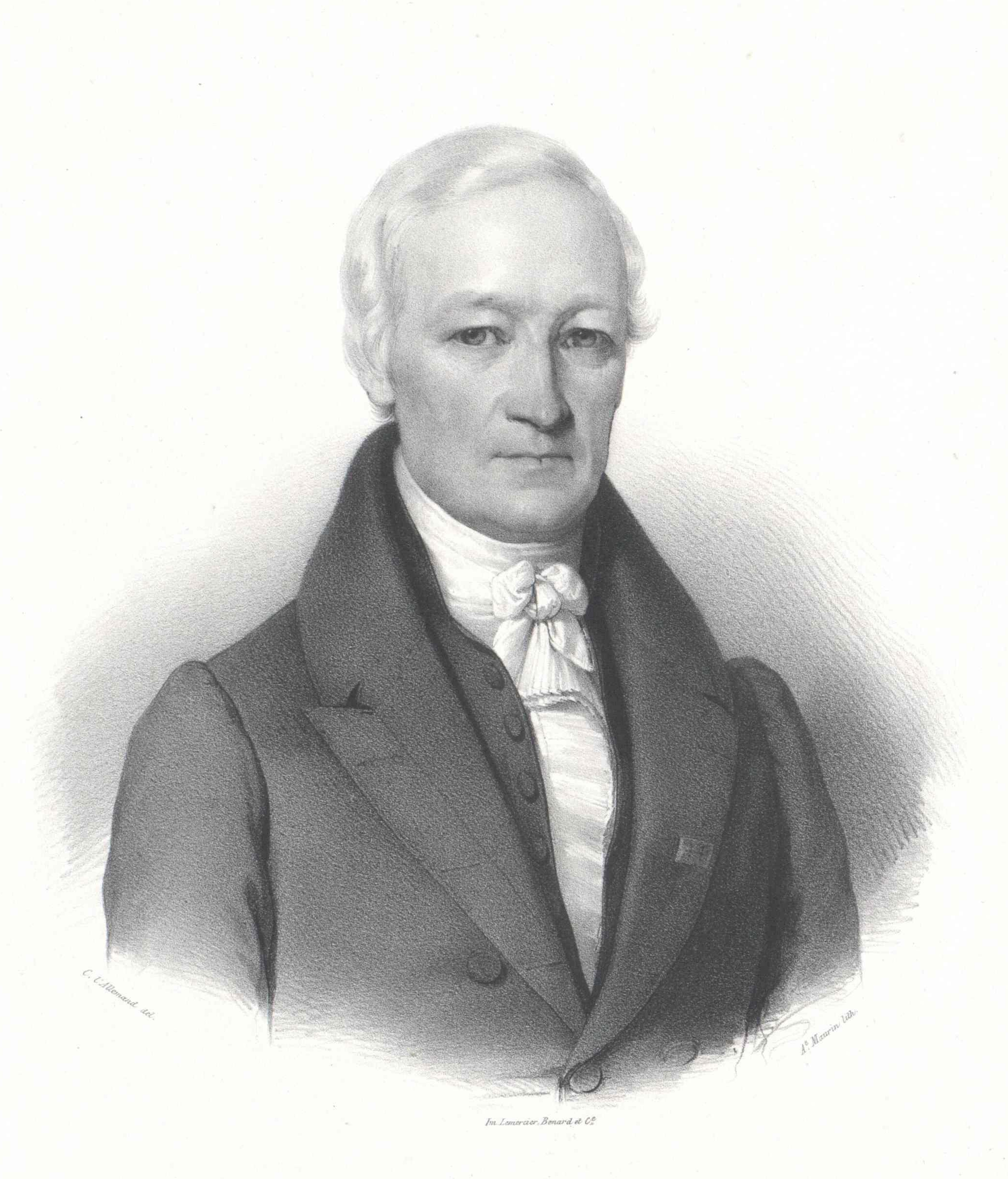
- Tiedemann in 1820
- Born: 23 August 1781; Cassel, Landgraviate of Hesse-Kassel
- Died: 22 January 1861 (aged 79); Munich, Kingdom of Bavaria
- Education: University of Marburg (MD, 1804); University of Bamberg; University of Würzburg
- Father: Dietrich Tiedemann
- Relatives: Gustav Tiedemann (son); Heinrich Tiedemann (son)
- Scientific career
- Fields: Anatomy
- Workplaces: University of Marburg; University of Landshut; Heidelberg University
- Doctoral advisor: J. W. C. Brühl
- Other academic advisors: Conrad Moench; Georg Wilhelm Stein; Adalbert Friedrich Marcus; Carl Caspar von Siebold; Franz Kaspar Hesselbach; Georges Cuvier

Friedrich Tiedemann (23 August 1781 – 22 January 1861) was a German anatomist and physiologist. He was an expert on the anatomy of the brain.

Tiedemann spent most of his career as professor of anatomy and physiology at Heidelberg University, a position to which he was appointed in 1816, after having filled the chair of anatomy and zoology for ten years at Landshut. He was elected member of the Royal Swedish Academy of Sciences in 1827. In 1836, he was elected Honorary Fellow of the Royal College of Surgeons in Ireland.

== Life ==
Tiedemann was born at Cassel in Prussia (now central Germany), the eldest son of Dietrich Tiedemann (1748–1803), a philosopher and psychologist of considerable repute.

Friedrich studied medicine at Marburg, Bamberg and Würzburg Universities from 1798 and graduated in 1802. Undertaking practical experience he gained his doctorate (MD) from Marburg in 1804, but soon abandoned practice.

From 1804, he became a Docent, lecturing in Physiology and Comparative Osteology at Marburg University. The following year, at only 24 years of age, he became Professor of Zoology, Human Anatomy and Comparative Anatomy at Landshut University. In 1816, he moved to Heidelberg University as Professor of Physiology and Anatomy and remained there until his retirement in 1849.

He was elected a Foreign Fellow of the Royal Society of London in 1832 and an Honorary Fellow of the Royal Society of Edinburgh in 1838.

He died in Munich on 22 January 1861. He is buried in the Alter Südfriedhof in Munich (Old South Cemetery).

== Viewpoints ==
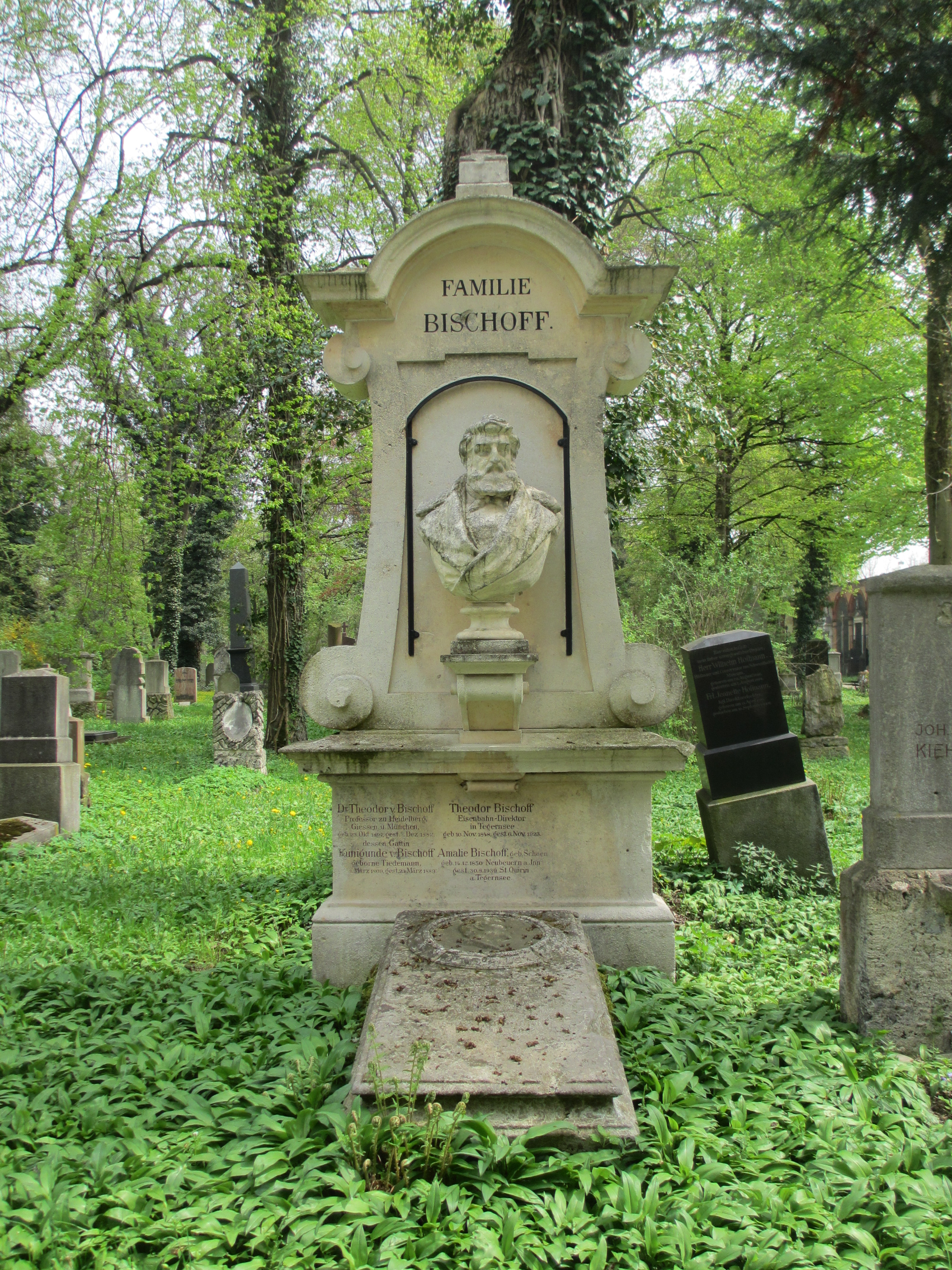
The grave of Friedrich Tiedemann

Tiedemann devoted himself to the study of natural science, and upon moving to Paris, became an ardent follower of Georges Cuvier. On his return to Germany, he advocated for anatomical research and aligned himself with the emerging field of experimental natural science. His staunch empiricism placed him at odds with contemporary adherents of romantic Naturphilosophie, such philosopher Friedrich Wilhelm Joseph von Schelling and naturalist Lorenz Oken.

Tiedemann was among the first to scientifically contest racism. In his 1836 article "On the Brain of the Negro, compared with that of the European and the Orang-outang," he compared the brain weight and cranial capacity of European and black human specimens with that of apes and concluded that, contrary to the consensus among his naturalist colleagues, the two racial groups exhibited "absolutely no difference whatsoever" in brain size or structure--up to point. He wrote in his renowned article: "The Negro brain does not resemble that of the Orang-Outang more than the European brain, except in the more symmetrical distribution of the gyri and sulci. It is not even certain if this is always the case. We cannot therefore coincide with the opinion of many naturalists, who say that the Negro has more resemblance to Apes than Europeans, in reference to the brain and nervous system." He further contested the notion that "there is any innate difference in the intellectual faculties of these two varieties of the human race" and attributed the perceived inferiority of black people to the deleterious effects of slavery and colonialism.

In 1827, he became a correspondent of the Royal Institute of the Netherlands, and when that became the Royal Netherlands Academy of Arts and Sciences in 1851, he joined as a foreign member. He was elected a Foreign Honorary Member of the American Academy of Arts and Sciences in 1849.

Tiedemann was influenced by Jean-Baptiste Lamarck and accepted the transmutation of species. Science historian Robert J. Richards has written that Tiedemann "joined the basic notion of species evolution, of a Lamarckian flavor, with the proposition that higher animals in their embryological development recapitulated the morphological stages of those lower in the scale." Writing in 1913, Hans Gadow noted that Tiedemann in 1814 had identified a basic function of sexual selection in preventing less fit males from propagating, and fossils as showing gradual metamorphosis of species over geological time.

In an 1854 medical-historical tract on tobacco, Tiedemann identified several adverse health effects of tobacco consumption, including cancers of the tongue brought on by smoking.

== Family ==
In 1807, he married Frauline von Holzing. He was later married to Charlotte Hecker.

He had a daughter Elise.

One of Tiedemann's sons, Gustav, was a casualty of the 1848 uprisings.

His son Heinrich immigrated to Philadelphia and became a physician in Philadelphia's Germantown Hospital. Perhaps influenced by his father's work, he objected to the Darwinian contention of a continuity between humans and apes.

== Legacy ==
In 2007, Brazilian geneticist Sergio Pena called Tiedemann an "anti-racist ahead of his time".

== Works (translated) ==
- Tiedemann, Friedrich (1813). Friedrich Tiedemann's Anatomy of Headless Abortions: along with four copper plates. Landshut.
- Tiedemann, Friedrich (1816). Anatomy and history of the brain's formation in the fetus of man, together with a comparative account of the structure of the brain in the animals. Nuremberg.
- Tiedemann, Friedrich (1821). Friderici Tiedemann Anatomists Et Physiologiae in Academia Heidelbergensi Professoris Icones Cerebri Simiarum Et Quorundam Mammalium Rariorum. Heidelberg.
- Tiedemann, Friedrich (1822). Friderici Tiedemanni Tabulae arteriarum corporis humani / Friederich Tiedemann's Illustrations of the arteries of the human body (explanations). Karlsruhe, Heidelberg.
- Tiedemann, Friedrich (1822). Friderici Tiedemanni Tabulae arteriarum corporis humani / Friederich Tiedemann's Illustrations of the arteries of the human body (panels). Karlsruhe, Heidelberg.
- Tiedemann, Friedrich; Gmelin, Leopold (1827). Some new constituents of bile of the ox. Leipzig.
- Tiedemann, Friedrich (1829). Anufuf to the humanity of the higher authorities of justice care in Germany, caused by a beheaded on 22 October 1827 in Heidelberg beheading. Darmstadt.
- Tiedemann, Friedrich (1837). The Negro's Brain Compared With The European And Orang-Outang: With Six Panels. Heidelberg.
- Tiedemann, Friedrich (1840). Of the Duverneyschen, Bartholin's or Cowper's glands of the woman, and the oblique shape and position of the uterus: With four panels of illustrations. Heidelberg, Leipzig.
