= Johann Georg Heine =

German physician (1771–1838)

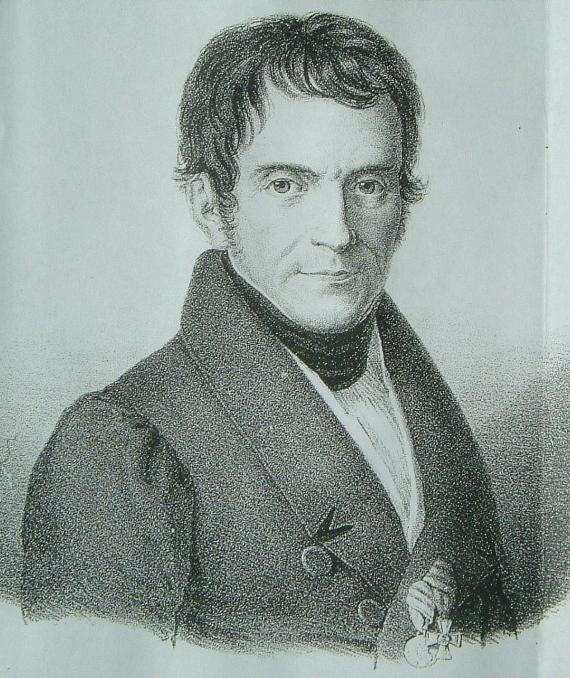
- The German orthopedist Johann Georg Heine
- Born: 3 April 1771; Lauterbach, Habsburg Empire (in present-day Germany)
- Died: 7 September 1838 (aged 67); Scheveningen, The Netherlands

Johann Georg Heine (3 April 1771 – 7 September 1838) was a German orthopedic mechanic and medical doctor. He is considered the father of Orthopedics in Germany.

== From cutler to orthopedic mechanic ==
Heine was born in Lauterbach on 3 April 1771, the son of a brewer. He was apprenticed to a cutler at Überlingen and worked as a journeyman cutler in Esslingen am Neckar, Mannheim and Straßburg. At length he left Southern Germany and took his residence in Berlin from 1794 to 1798, where he got into contact with Barthel von Siebold, a son of a Würzburg surgeon Carl Caspar von Siebold. In May 1798 Heine moved to Würzburg and became a craftsman making medical instruments for the Würzburg University. He married Anna Förtsch from Würzburg and had two children, Anna (born 1801), who later married her cousin Bernhard Heine, and Joseph Heine (born 1803), who was to become an important physician in the Electorate of the Palatinate.

== Heine's workshop – Heine's orthopedic institute ==
Soon Heine had his own workshop where he manufactured artificial limbs, stretching beds, wheelchairs and other orthopedic appliances and offered them for sale. In 1807 Heine published his Systematic Index of surgery instruments, bandages and machines, a kind of catalogue for physicians, with later editions in 1811 and 1827. His subsequent publications soon met with recognition among medical experts. He declined an offer to work in Berlin and stayed in Würzburg. The Bavarian crown prince awarded him an order for his merits ("Goldene Zivil-Dienst-Medaille") and even Johann Wolfgang von Goethe knew Heine's publications and included them in his library. He got to know "Operateur Heine" at the dinner table of Grand Duke Karl August and invited him to his private home.

In 1816 Johann Georg Heine opened the first orthopedic institution on German soil. A former monastery (Stephanskloster) in Würzburg housed it and later it became well-known all over Europe as the Karolinen-Institut named after Queen Caroline of Bavaria.

By that time the successful mechanic had become a physician although he had no classical medical knowledge. When he started to cure non-orthopedic diseases he provoked conflicts with the rest of the Würzburg doctors, which put an end to a long period of successful co-operation.

== The dark years ==
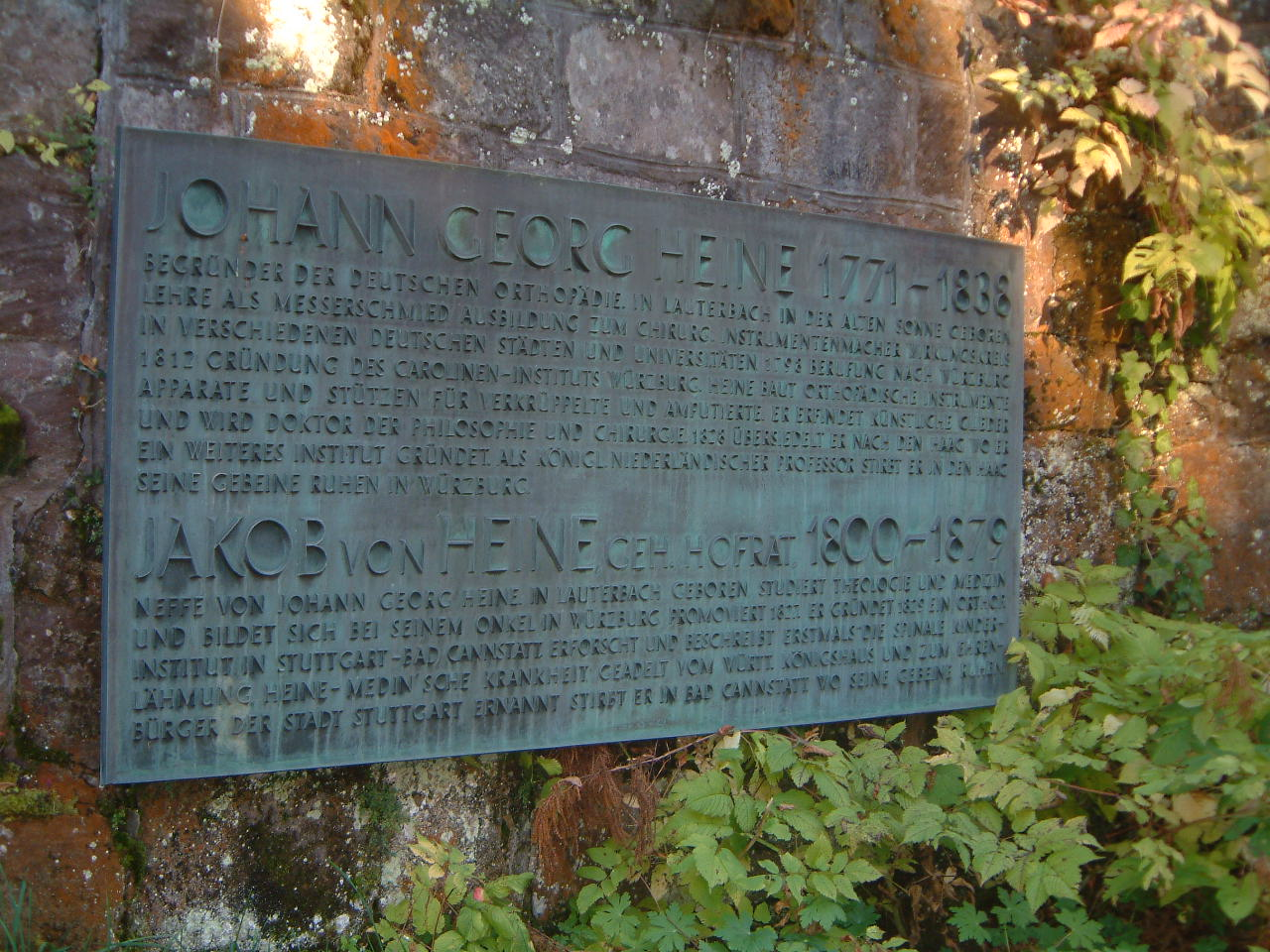
Memorial plaque for Heine and his nephew at his birthplace, Lauterbach (Black Forest)

In 1829 Heine handed the institution over to his nephew Bernhard Heine and moved to the Netherlands. He bought buildings in Brussels and The Hague in order to establish medical institutions. Halfway between The Hague and Scheveningen he established a seaside hospital. Heine had recognized the healing effects medical baths – he tried to match orthopedics and balneotherapy.

When he tried to cure cholera with baths of ground mustard seed he once again got into conflict with the orthodox school of medicine. Dutch doctors stopped sending him their patients. News from Bavaria let him know that he was banned from practising orthopedics there. He fell ill with hydrothorax and died on 7 September 1838 in Scheveningen. He was buried in Würzburg, where in 1841 a monument was erected presenting a life-size statue of Heine.

At the church wall of Heine's birthplace Lauterbach there is a bronze plate – put up in 1971, 200 years after his birth – commemorating Johann Georg Heine and his nephew Jakob Heine.

== Bibliography and references ==
- Hans Hekler: Johann Georg Heine, ein Lauterbacher, den selbst Goethe bewunderte in D'Kräz. In: Beiträge zur Geschichte der Stadt und Raumschaft Schramberg. Heft 8, Schramberg 1988 (also online, see external links)
- Heinz Hansen: Die Orthopädenfamilie Heine – Leben und Wirken der einzelnen Familienmitglieder im Zeichen einer bedeutenden deutschen Familientradition des neunzehnten Jahrhunderts. doctoral thesis, Dresden 1993
- Doris Schwarzmann-Schafhauser: Im Spannungsfeld zwischen Medikasterei und "wissenschaftlicher" Heilkunde – Johann Georg Heine und die akademischen Anfänge der Orthopädie. doctoral thesis, Würzburg 1994
- Andreas Mettenleiter: Das Juliusspital in Würzburg, Band 3, Medizingeschichte, Würzburg 2001, pp. 108–116
