= Stiftung Juliusspital Würzburg =

Juliusspital
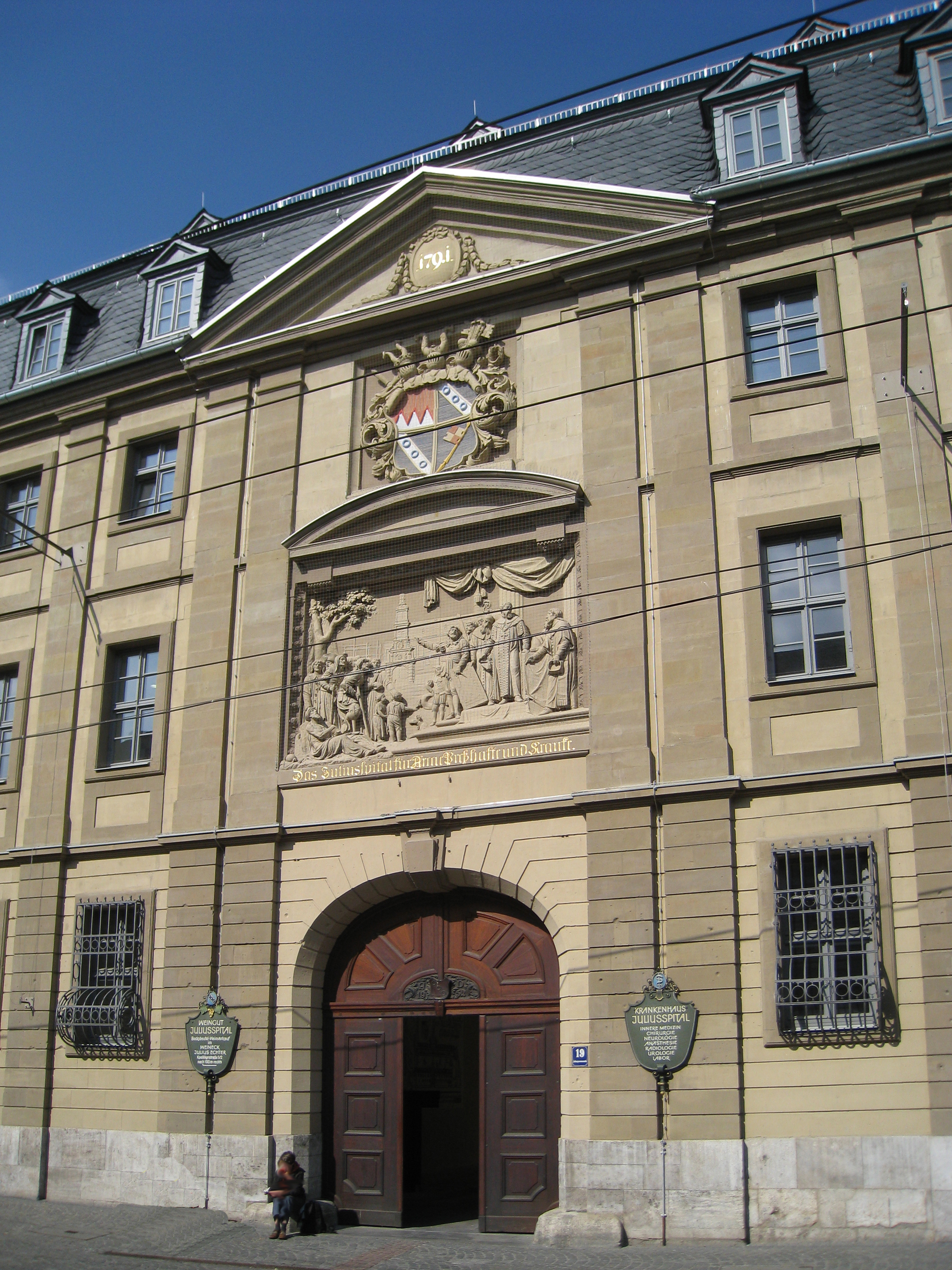
- Entrance to the Juliusspital on the Juliuspromenade
- Interactive map of the Juliusspital area

General information
- Location: Würzburg, Juliuspromenade 19; 97070 Würzburg, Germany
- Coordinates: 49°47′51″N 9°55′55″E
- Inaugurated: 1576

Website
- www.juliusspital.de

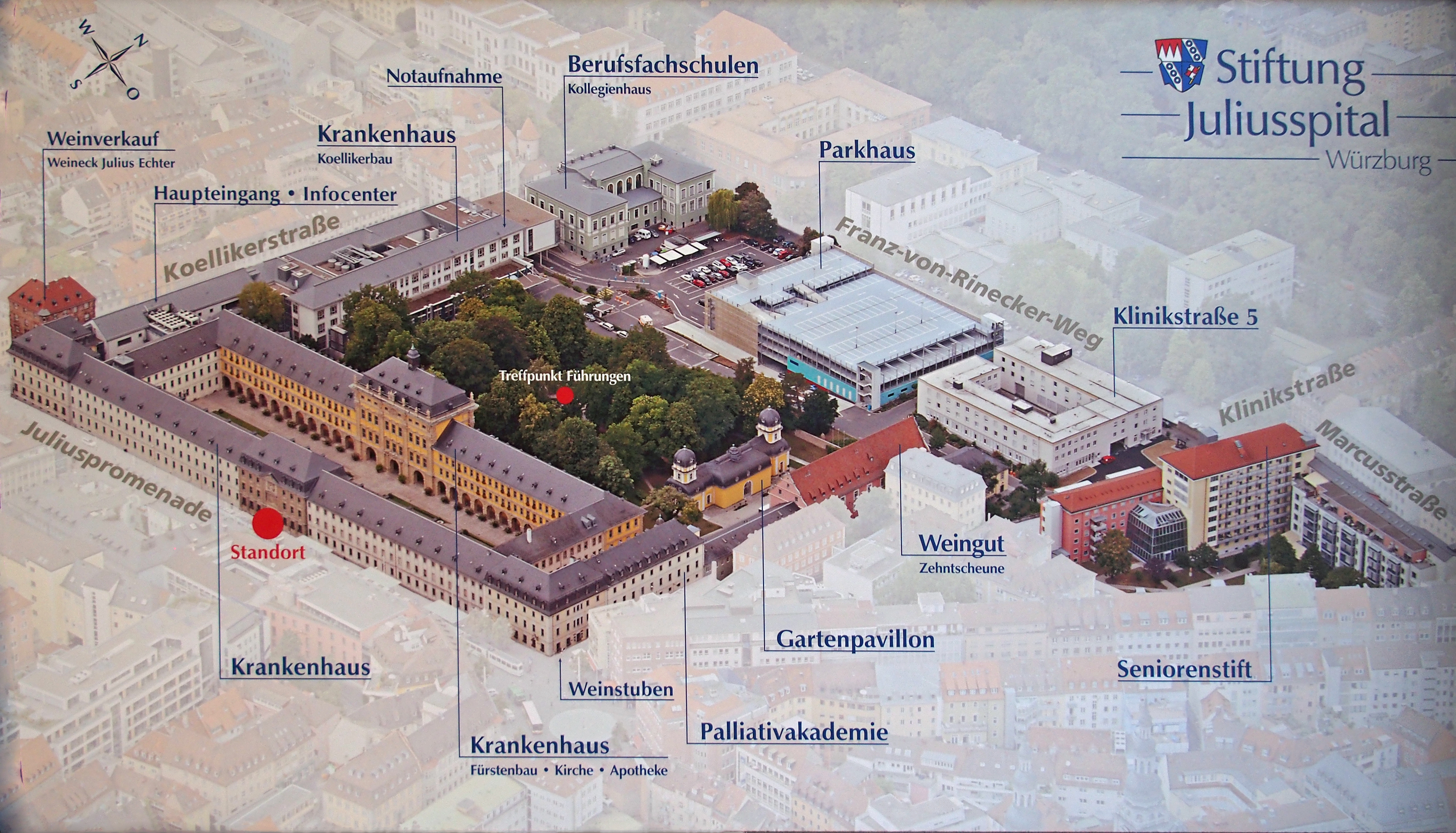
Map of Juliusspital

Stiftung Juliusspital Würzburg is a foundation in Würzburg, Germany that includes the Juliusspital (hospital) and the Juliusspital winery. It was created as a hospital in 1576 by the Prince-Bishop of Würzburg, Julius Echter von Mespelbrunn.

== History ==
The hospital was founded by Julius Echter, Prince-Bishop of Würzburg, in 1576 on the ground of a Jewish cemetery with the endowment of the abandoned Monastery of Sancta Vallis in Heiligenthal.

It originally also accepted pilgrims, people suffering from epilepsy, and orphans.

=== Regional influence ===
The end of the Thirty Years' War in 1648 left part of the village of Thüngen in the hands of the Prince-Bishop of Würzburg, administered by the Juliusspital. In Gräfendorf the Barons of Thüngen and the Juliusspital in Würzburg shared the lordship. The latter's rights passed under the German Mediatisation in 1803 to Bavaria, and in 1805 to the Grand Duchy of Aschaffenburg. Also in the course of this secularization in 1803, the rights of the Prince-Bishopric of Würzburg in Karsbach, and those held by the Juliusspital, passed to Bavaria, which under the terms of the Peace of Pressburg it ceded to the newly formed Grand Duchy of Würzburg.

In 1878, in an article in The Examiner comparing the status of medical education in England and overseas, reported that "In Germany, the faculties are more equal. In University of Würzburg, owing to the large and rich Julius-Spital, the medical faculty is the most numerous."

=== Notable staff and students ===
In 1776 Carl Caspar von Siebold was appointed as head physician (Oberwundarzt) of the Juliusspital. Under his leadership, new surgical techniques were introduced, a regimen of hygiene was established, and renovation of the Theatrum Anatomicum took place. In 1805 the Juliusspital reportedly had the first modern operating theater in the world. Georg Anton Schäffer studied medicine at Juliusspital's College of Medicine. He joined the Imperial Russian service as a surgeon, serving in Moscow before 1812. In 1816, Cajetan von Textor was appointed professor of surgery and Oberwundarzt in the Juliusspital. His students included Bernhard Heine (1800–1846), inventor of the osteotome. In 1863, Franz von Rinecker became director of psychiatry at the Juliusspital, and in 1872 took on additional responsibilities as director of dermatology. In 1870, Friedrich Jolly was his assistant.

== Buildings and architecture ==
Juliusspital is a Baroque hospital with a courtyard and a church originally established in 1576. However, the 160 m long northern wing was added by Antonio Petrini in 1700–4. Beneath it lies the similarly sized wine cellar. The Rococo pharmacy survived the bombing of 1945 largely undamaged. North of the Spital is a park used by the patients, fronted to the right by the Alte Anatomie (by Joseph Greising, built in 1705–14. This was renovated in 1788 and used by the medical faculty such as Albert von Kölliker, von Siebold or Rudolf Virchow to instruct up to 48 students in surgery and anatomy. The park also features a water basin by Jacob van der Auvera with stone dolphins and allegorical figures for the Franconian rivers Main, Tauber, Saale and Sinn. It sports the coat-of-arms of Johann Philipp von Greifenclau zu Vollraths.

The buildings are maintained to a high standard - they had a new pipe organ built by Orgelbau Vleugels in 2005.

== Today ==
Juliusspital continues to function as a hospital and retirement home. It is also the second largest winery in Germany and the biggest individual German wine grower, at 177 hectares. Weingut Juliusspital is within the Franconian wine region and a member of Association of German Prädikat Wine Estates.

== Gallery ==
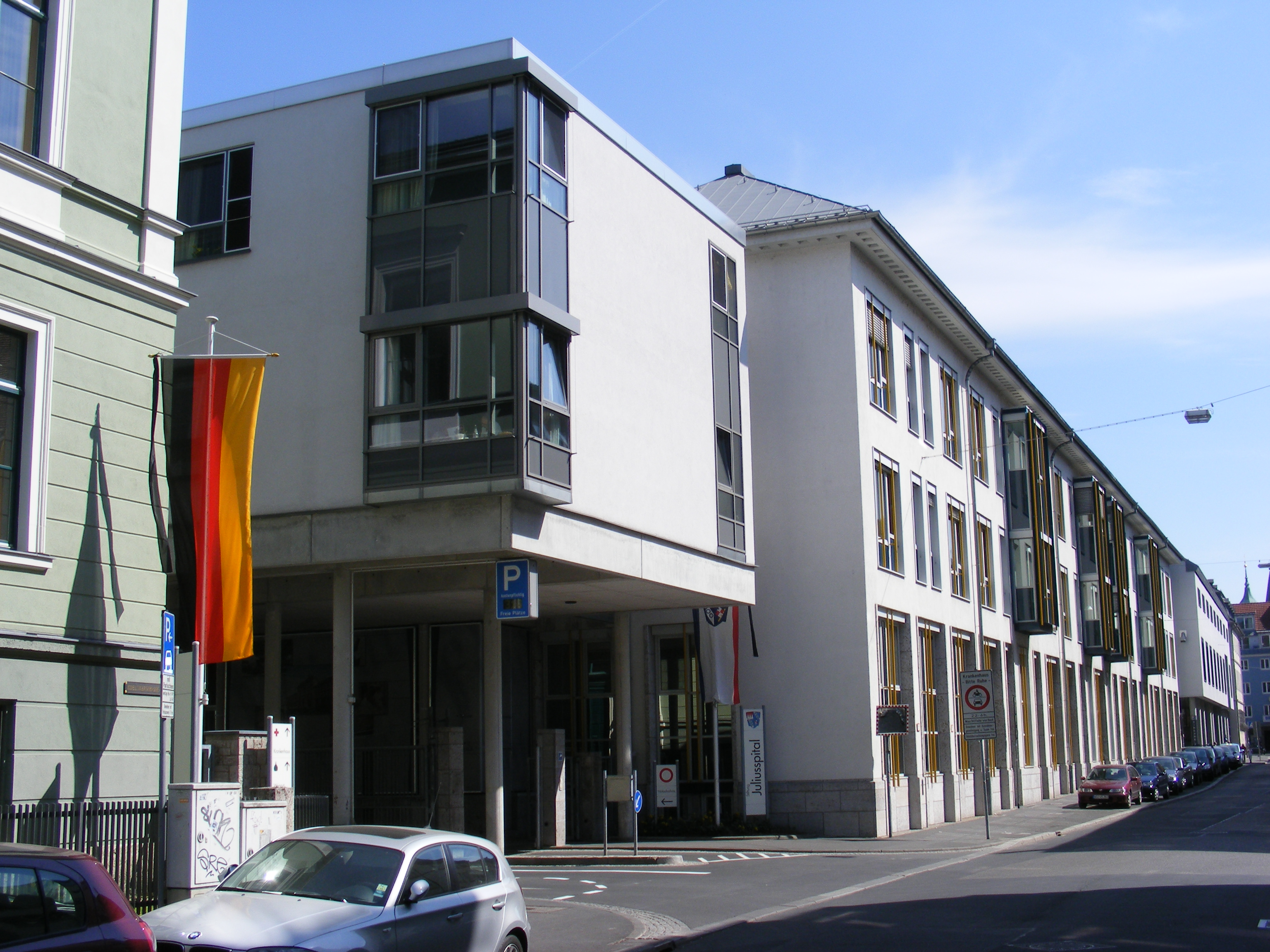
Modern hospital wing

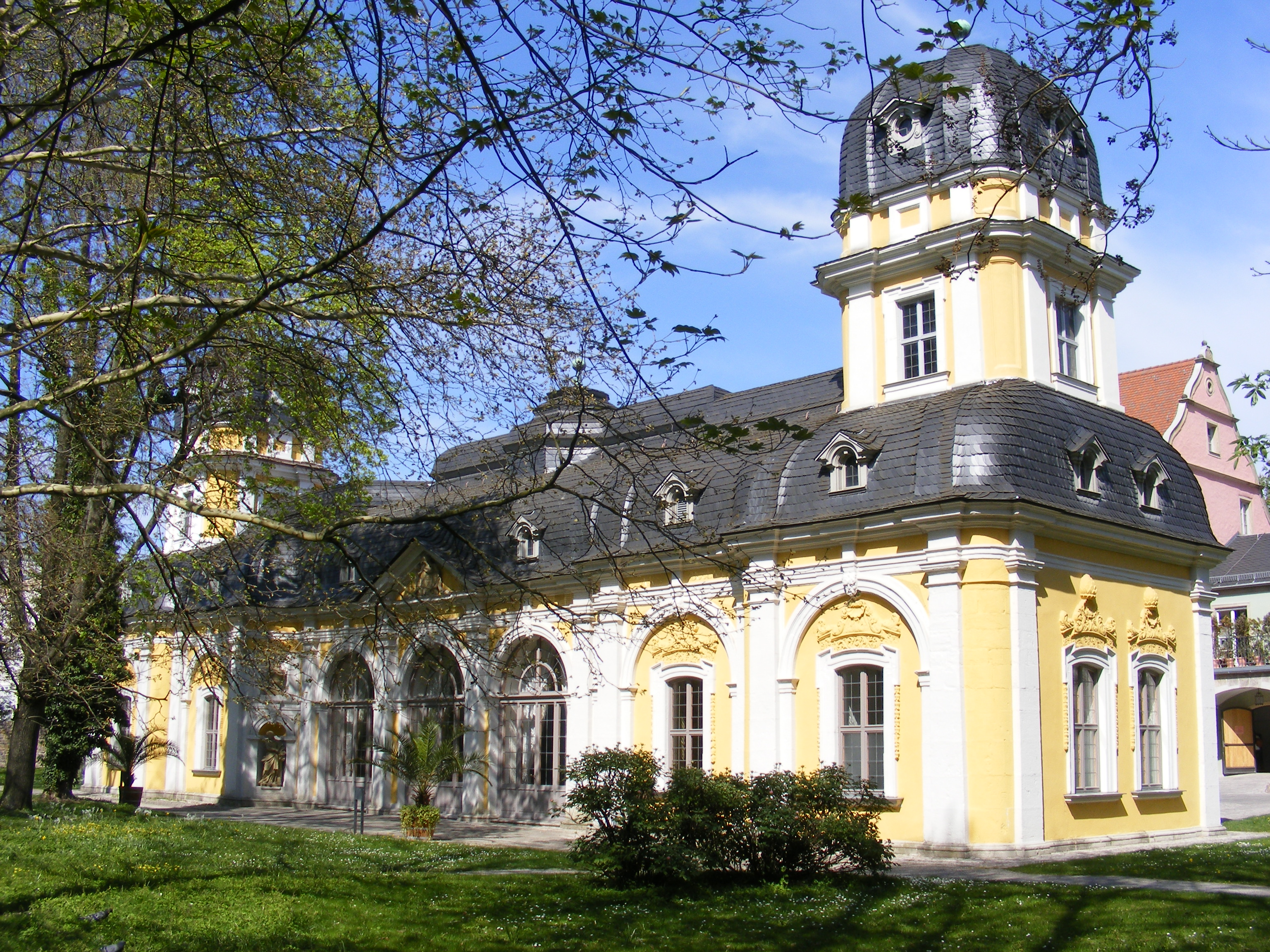
Alte Anatomie

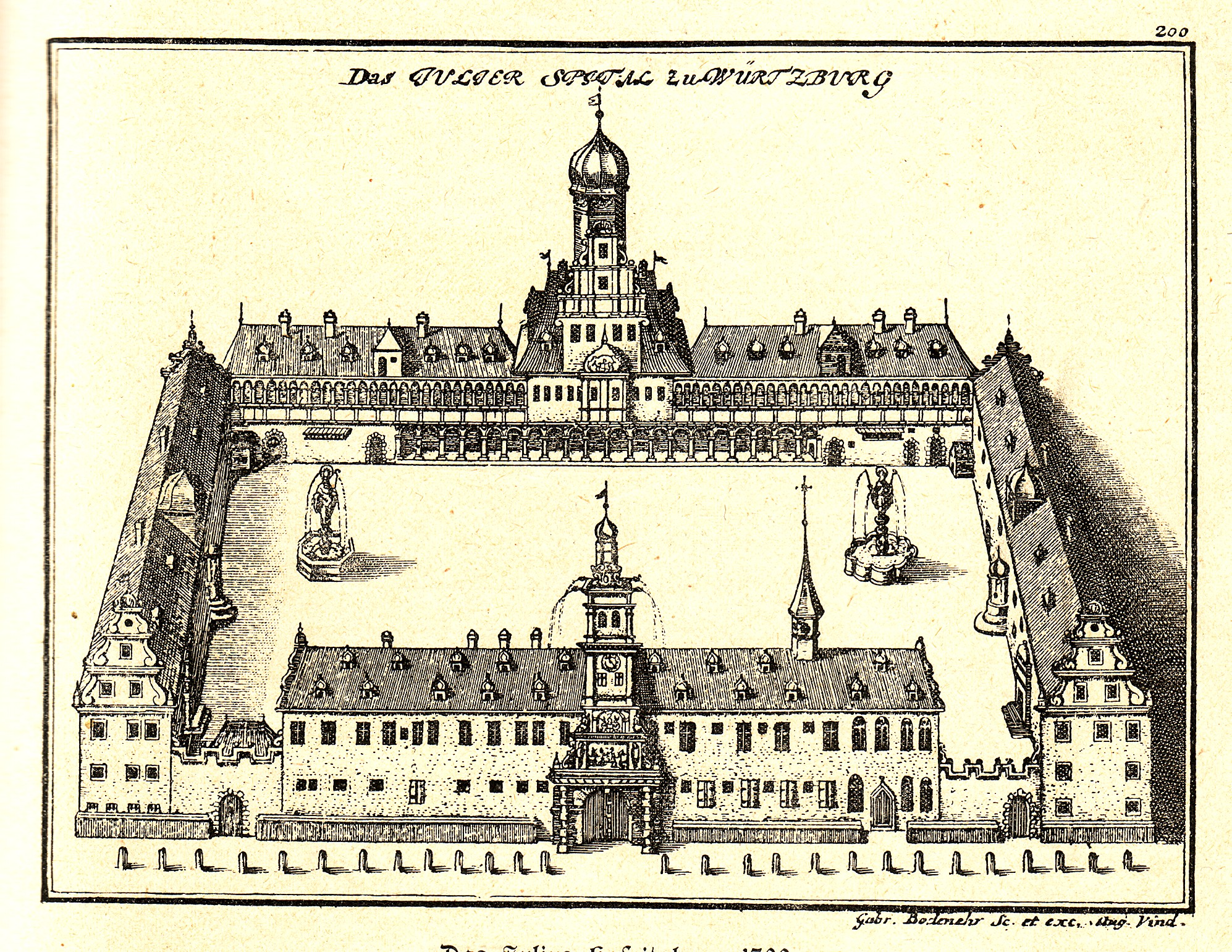
Drawing after an engraving by Matthäus Merian (1648)

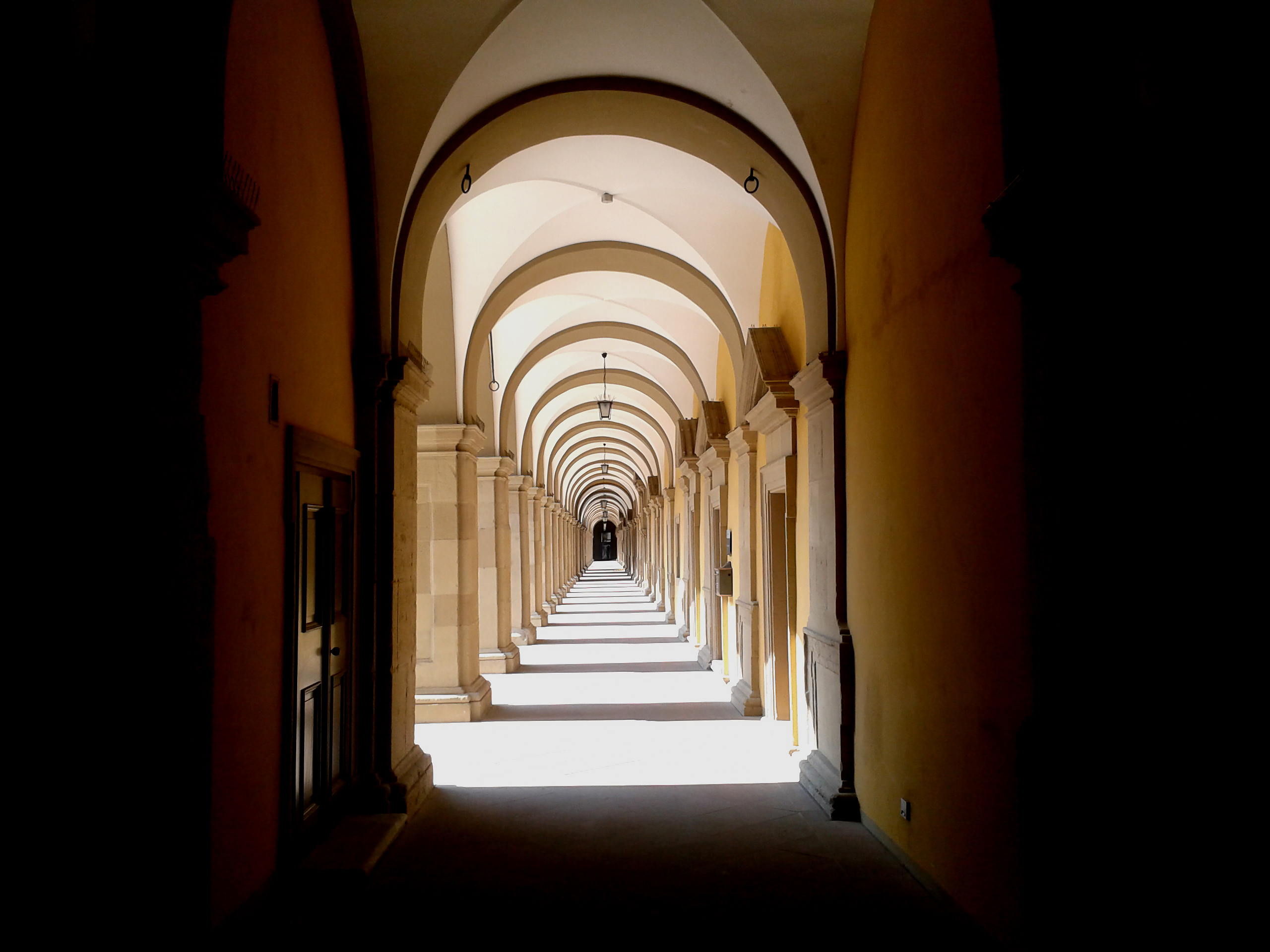
Arcades of the Juliusspital

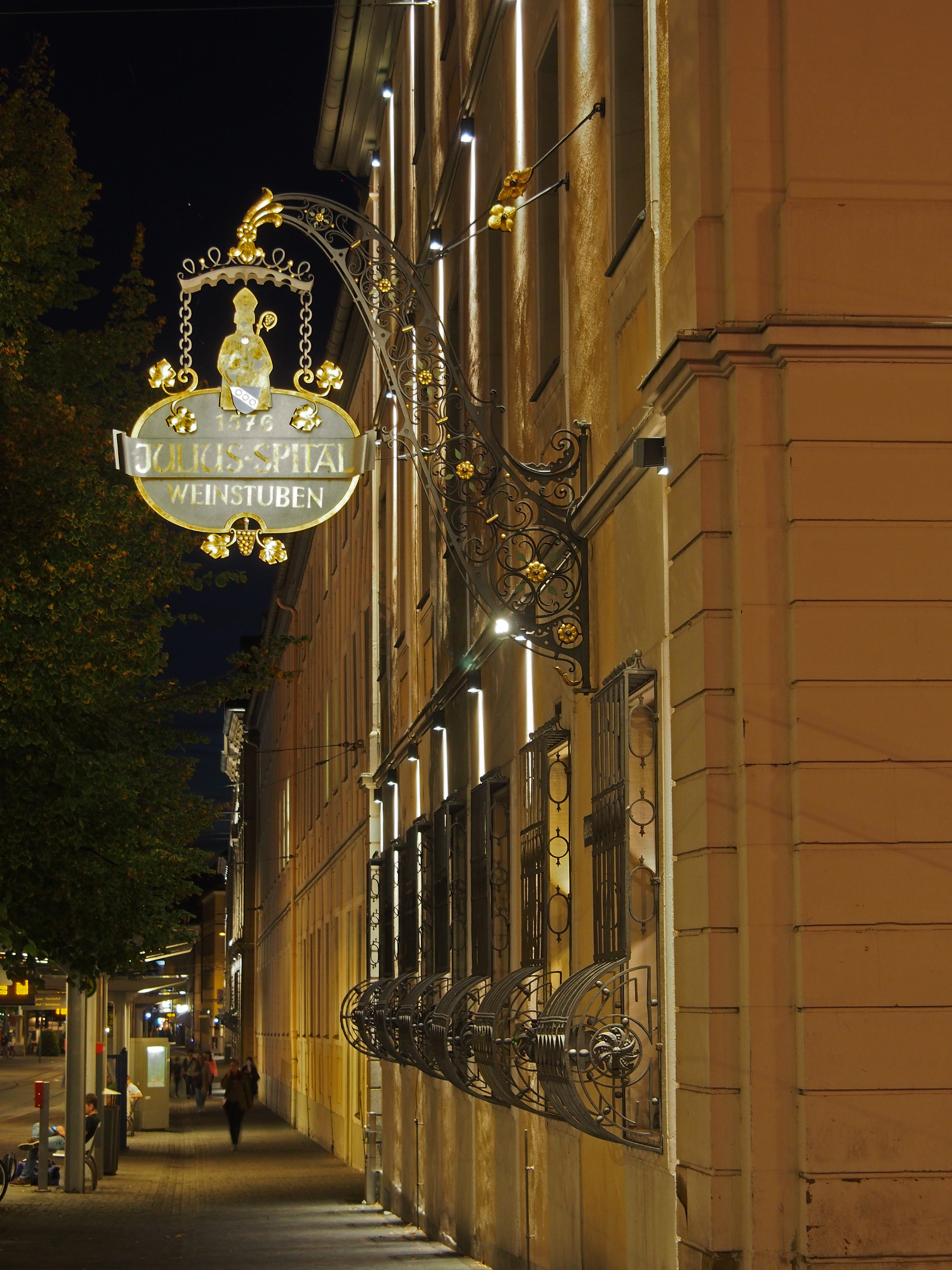
Sign of the Weinstuben wine bar/restaurant

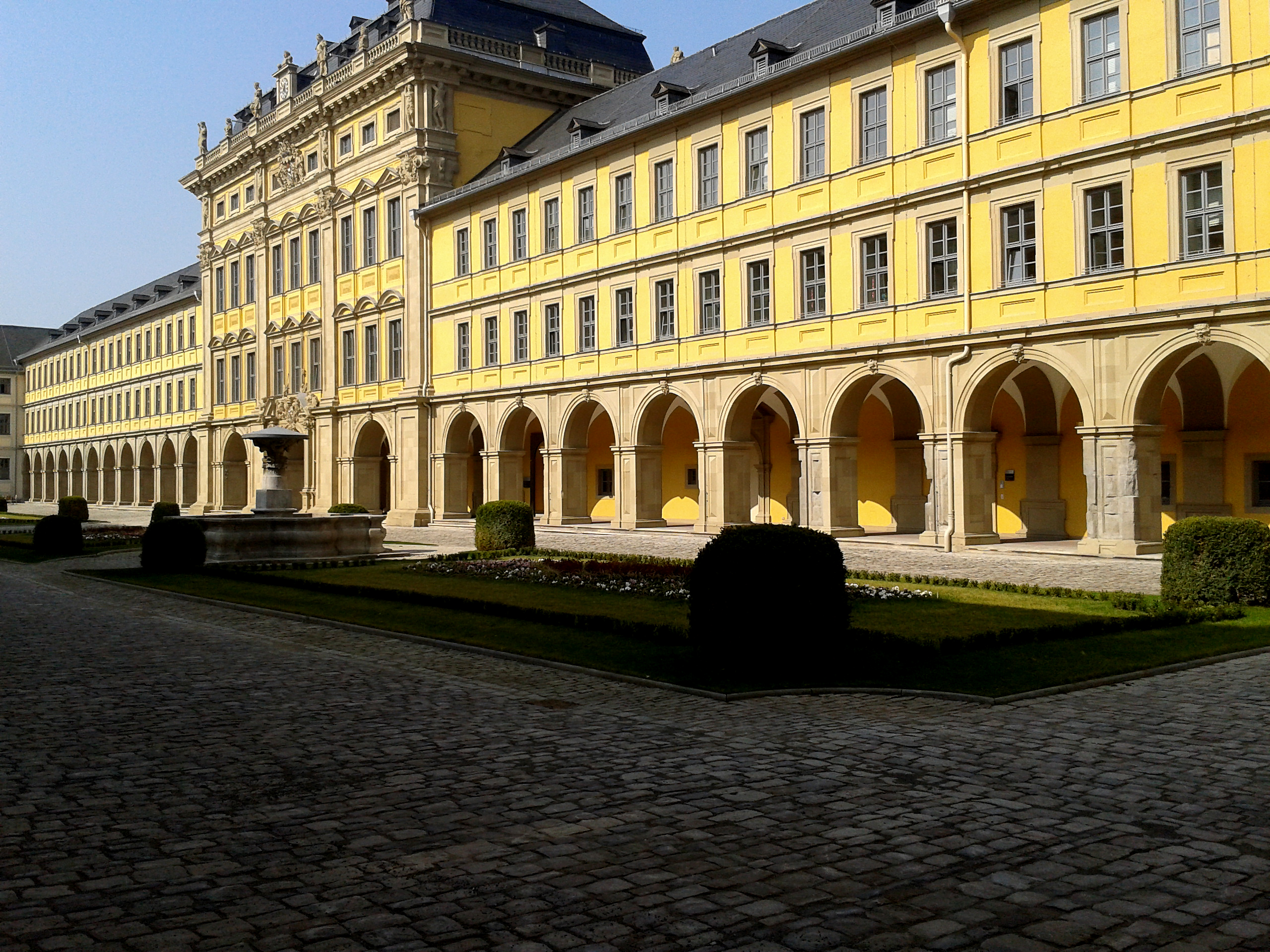
Northern Baroque wing with arcades

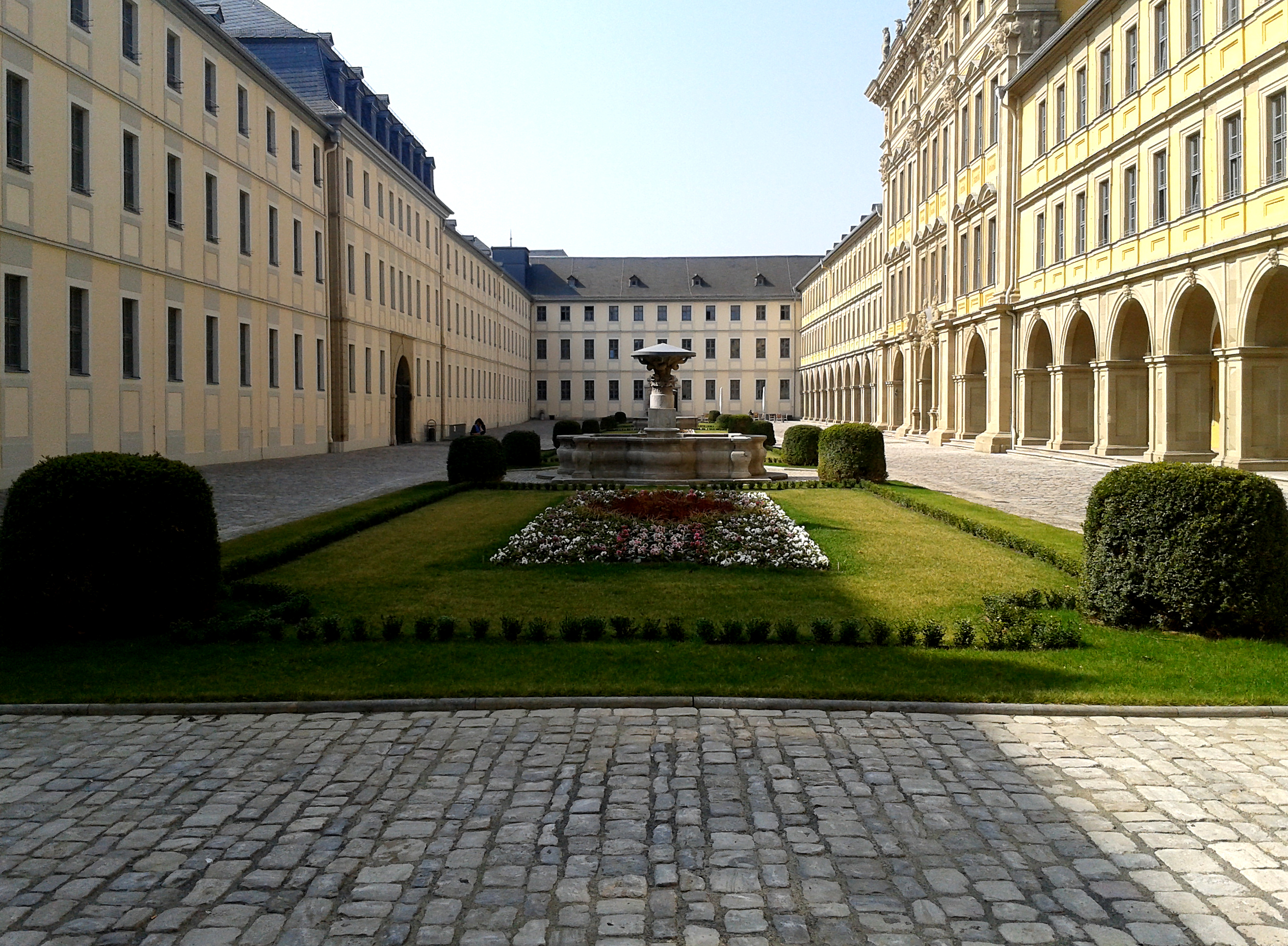
Inner courtyard

== Bibliography ==
- Oberpflegeamt der Stiftung Juliusspital Würzburg (Hrsg.): Das Juliusspital Würzburg in Vergangenheit und Gegenwart: Festschrift aus Anlaß der Einweihung der wiederaufgebauten Pfarrkirche des Juliusspitals am 16. Juli 1953. Würzburg: Fränkische Gesellschaftsdruckerei 1953.
- Ludwig Weiss (Bearb.), Oberpflegeamt der Stiftung Juliusspital Würzburg (Hrsg.): 400 Jahre Pfarrkirche St. Kilian im Juliusspital zu Würzburg. Würzburg 1980.
- Johanna Bleker (Hrsg.): Kranke und Krankheiten im Juliusspital zu Würzburg 1819 – 1829: zur frühen Geschichte des allgemeinen Krankenhauses in Deutschland. In: Abhandlungen zur Geschichte der Medizin und der Naturwissenschaften, 72. Husum: Matthiesen, 1995, ISBN 3-7868-4072-5.
- Andreas Mettenleiter: Die Anatomenskulpturen von Johann Peter Wagner an der Fassade des juliusspitälischen Gartenpavillons in Würzburg. Würzburger medizinhistorische Mitteilungen, 18. Königshausen & Neumann, Würzburg 1999.
- Robert Wagner: Wein- und Fleischzeichen des Juliusspital zu Würzburg. In: Mainfränkisches Jahrbuch für Geschichte und Kunst, 25 (= 96), 1973, S. 145–149.
