= Johann Joseph Dömling =

German physician and professor

Johann Joseph Dömling (13 January 1771 – 7 March 1803) was a German physician, pauper's doctor and professor of physiology at the University of Würzburg. He was the son of a farmer who was unable to afford further education himself, but as a gifted student, his studies were supported by the prince-bishop Franz Ludwig von Erthal. After his studies of medicine, Dömling went on a study tour, meeting many important physicians of his era as well as the Romantic philosophers Johann Gottlieb Fichte and Friedrich Wilhelm Joseph Schelling. He became professor of physiology in Würzburg in 1799 and was popular with his students.

Dömling was critical of humorism and originally supported a mechanistic physiology. After early publications critical of Schelling's philosophical approach, Dömling became a supporter, basing his textbook on human physiology on Schelling's theories. His textbook, considered part of a transition from anatomy-based physiology to one based on organic function, also contains the earliest reference to the endogenous presence of carbon monoxide in human blood. Dömling died at the age of 32 from typhoid fever and pneumonia.

== Early life and education ==
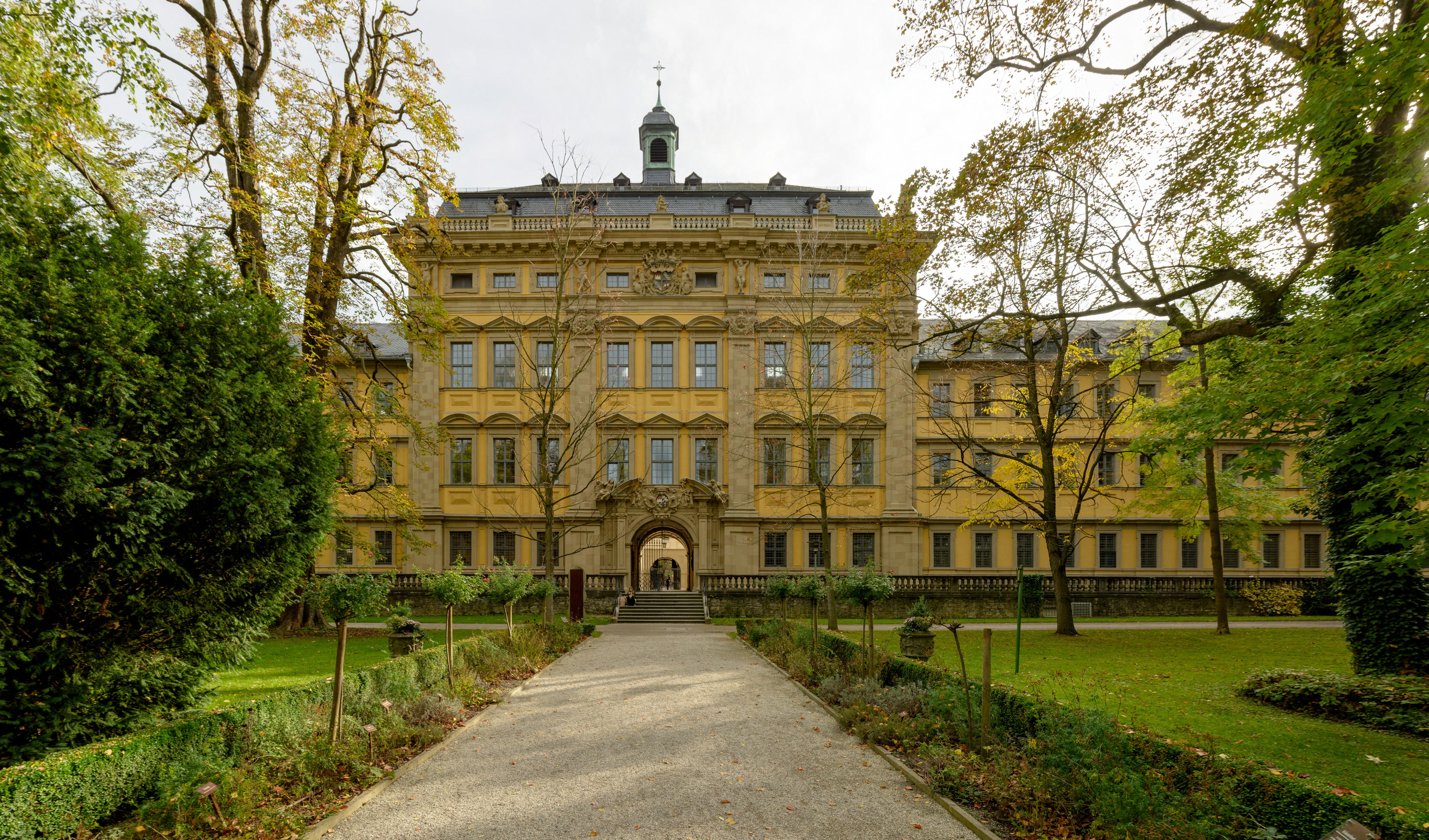
Juliusspital, Würzburg

Dömling was born in Merkershausen on 13 January 1771, near Bad Königshofen im Grabfeld, Prince-Bishopric of Würzburg (now part of Bavaria). His father was the farmer Johannes Dömling and his mother was Anna Dorothea Dömling, née Eschbach. Dömling first attended the village school in Merkershausen and then another school in nearby Bad Königshofen, where he started to learn some Latin, but his parents were unable to afford a gymnasium education. After a visit to his school by the prince-bishop, Franz Ludwig von Erthal, Dömling was given a place at the Juliusspitälisches Studentenkonvikt in the Juliusspital, a boarding school where up to 40 gifted but impoverished students were given a free education. As the best student in his graduating class, he was offered a free place to study theology. Instead, he chose to study medicine at the University of Würzburg, where he was supported financially by Erthal, who paid for his books and surgical instruments. While a medical student, Dömling worked as an assistant to the physician Nicolaus Anton Friedreich. After Erthal's 1795 death, Dömling's finances were uncertain, and he considered moving to Hamburg with the goal of becoming a naval surgeon in England. However, the new prince-bishop, Georg Karl Ignaz von Fechenbach zu Laudenbach, continued to support him financially and so he was able to finish his studies in Würzburg. Dömling received a doctorate in medicine on 23 June 1797. His medical thesis was Dissertatio inauguralis sistens morborum gastricorum acutorum pathologiam ('Inaugural dissertation on the pathology of acute gastric diseases') and his advisor was Carl Caspar von Siebold. The main topic of the thesis was the function and the mechanism of action of bile.

== Academic career ==
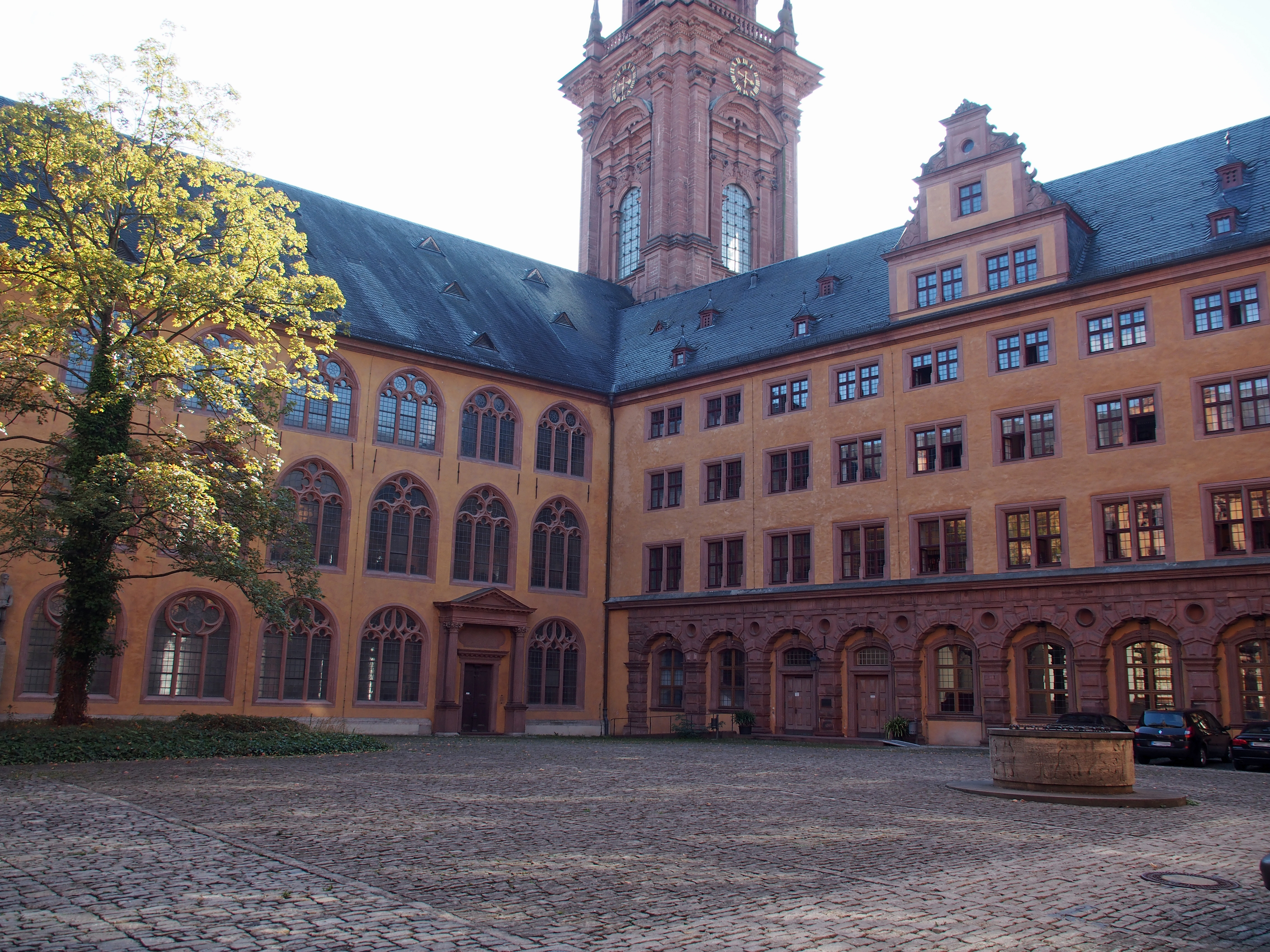
University of Würzburg

After finishing his studies in Würzburg, Dömling went on a study tour. He travelled to Vienna, where he met the physiologist Johann Peter Frank and the obstetrician Johann Lucas Boër and other important physicians. In Göttingen, he met the obstetrician Friedrich Benjamin Osiander. Other stages of his journey were Prague, Dresden, Leipzig, Jena (where he met the Romantic philosophers Johann Gottlieb Fichte and Friedrich Wilhelm Joseph Schelling) and Berlin. After the 1798 death of Georg Christoph von Siebold, Dömling succeeded him as professor of physiology in Würzburg on 20 August 1799. He also became the Stadtarmenarzt, the pauper's doctor of the city of Würzburg. This type of organised medical care for prisoners, workhouse residents and the poor in Würzburg started in 1795 and was the foundation for the 1807 establishment of the Würzburg policlinic.

Dömling lectured on all medical subjects, especially physiology, pathology and medical semiotics and was popular with the medical students. He married Johanna Adelheid Scheffner (1773–1839) in 1800. They had two children, Apollonia Dömling and G. Joseph Dömling.

== Medical philosophy, research and publications ==
From early on, Dömling was an opponent of humorism, the ancient theory going back to Hippocrates that in a healthy body, the four "humors" (blood, phlegm, black bile and yellow bile) had to be balanced. Dömling originally supported a mechanistic physiology, a theory going back to Descartes that viewed the body as a mechanical system of pipes and pumps. He was also interested in empirical research, for example in the response of organs to electric stimuli. In his 1798 publication Ist die Leber Reinigungsorgan? ('Is the liver a purifying organ') he denied that the liver had a purifying function. At the time, it was still debated whether the liver had any function other than the production of bile. In 1800, he published Giebt es ursprünglich Krankheiten der Säfte, welche sind es und welche sind es nicht ('Are there originally diseases of the fluids, which are thus and which are not') he was critical of Schelling's Romantic natural philosophy, but by 1802 had become a supporter. His textbook Lehrbuch der Physiologie des Menschen ('Textbook on human physiology') appeared in Göttingen in two volumes in 1802 and 1803. It was based on theories of Schelling, who came to Würzburg as professor of philosophy in 1803. The historian of life sciences, Joan Steigerwald, describes Dömling's textbook as part of a transition from anatomy-based physiology to one based on organic functions. The second volume contains the first description of an endogenous presence of carbon monoxide in human blood. Similar to John Bostock in 1804, Dömling stated that venous blood containing carbon monoxide returned to the heart and would then be oxidised to carbon dioxide in the lung, and then exhaled. Together with Philipp Joseph Horsch, Dömling edited the journal Archiv für die Theorie der Heilkunde ('Archive for the Theory of Medicine'); one volume appeared in 1804. It contained two articles by Dömling, one about infectious diseases and another one regarding the nervous system.

== Death and aftermath ==
Dömling died in Würzburg on 7 March 1803 from typhoid fever and pneumonia. (Note: The date of 7 March is also given by Hirsch and Gerabek. Georg Sticker gives the date as 15 March.) The physicians Horsch and Thomann, who attended to Dömling, stated that the typhoid fever was curable but the pneumonia was deadly. A fake letter published in an 1803 journal blamed Horsch for Dömling's death, suggesting the latter had been murdered so Horsch could succeed him. The anonymous journal article was likely written by the Würzburg professor of theology Franz Berg and also mentioned allegations against Schelling regarding the death of his stepdaughter Auguste Böhmer, the daughter of Caroline Schelling that Berg had used in polemic attacks on Schelling and his philosophy. The chair of physiology at Würzburg was given to Ignaz Döllinger, who did not use Dömling's textbook as he considered it to be too subjective. Döllinger, who also followed Schelling's philosophy, additionally was made professor of anatomy in 1806.

== Works ==
- Dissertatio Inauguralis Sistens Morborum Gastricorum Acutorum Pathologiam [Inaugural dissertation regarding the pathology of acute gastric diseases] (Thesis) (in Latin). University of Würzburg. 1797.
- Ist die Leber Reinigungsorgan? [Is the liver a purifying organ?] (in German). Vienna: Franz Josef Rötzel. 1798.
- Giebt es ursprüngliche Krankheiten der Säfte: welche sind es, und welche sind es nicht [Are there original diseases of the bodily fluids: which are and which are not] (in German). Bamberg and Würzburg: Göbhardt. 1800.
- Kritik der vorzüglichsten Vorstellungsarten über Organisation und Lebensprincip [Critique of the most excellent ideas about organisation and vital principle] (in German). Würzburg: Franz Xaver Rienner. 1802.
- Lehrbuch der Physiologie des Menschen: Generelle Physiologie. Specielle Physiologie. Phänomene der Sensibilität und Aeusserungen der Irritabilität [Textbook of human physiology: General physiology. Special physiology. Phenomena of sensibility and expressions of irritability] (in German). Göttingen: Dieterich. 1802.
- Lehrbuch der Physiologie des Menschen: Specielle Physiologie. Wirkungen der Reproductionskraft [Textbook of human physiology: Special physiology. Actions of the reproductive force] (in German). Göttingen: Dieterich. 1803.

== Sources ==
- Engelhardt, Dietrich von (2023). "Johann Joseph Dömling". Medizin in Romantik und Idealismus. frommann-holzboog Verlag. pp. 111–114. doi:10.5771/9783772836503-iii111. ISBN 978-3-7728-3650-3.
- Franken, F. H. (1983). "History of Hepatology". In Csomós, Géza; Thaler, Heribert (eds.). Clinical Hepatology. Berlin, Heidelberg: Springer. pp. 1–15. doi:10.1007/978-3-642-68748-8_1. ISBN 978-3-642-68748-8.
- Gerabek, Werner (1995). Friedrich Wilhelm Joseph Schelling und die Medizin der Romantik : Studien zu Schellings Würzburger Periode. Frankfurt am Main; New York: P. Lang. ISBN 978-3-631-48865-2.
- Gerabek, Werner E. (31 December 2007). "Dömling, Johann Joseph". In Gerabek, Werner E.; Haage, Bernhard D.; Keil, Gundolf; Wegner, Wolfgang (eds.). Enzyklopädie Medizingeschichte. De Gruyter. pp. 318–319. doi:10.1515/9783110976946-008. ISBN 978-3-11-097694-6.
- Haeser, Heinrich (1875). Lehrbuch der Geschichte der Medicin und der epidemischen Krankheiten. Jena: Dufft.
- Hirsch, August (1877). "Doemling, Johann Josef" . Allgemeine Deutsche Biographie (in German). Vol. 5. Leipzig: Duncker & Humblot. pp. 288–289.
- Hopper, Christopher P.; Zambrana, Paige N.; Goebel, Ulrich; Wollborn, Jakob (1 June 2021). "A brief history of carbon monoxide and its therapeutic origins". Nitric Oxide. 111–112: 45–63. doi:10.1016/j.niox.2021.04.001. ISSN 1089-8603. PMID 33838343.
- Huneman, Philippe (2023). Death: perspectives from the philosophy of biology. Cham: Palgrave MacMillan. doi:10.1007/978-3-031-14417-2. ISBN 978-3-031-14416-5.
- Lanska, Douglas J. (29 May 2023). "Carbon monoxide poisoning". MedLink Neurology.
- Neuner, Stephanie; Nolte, Karen (1 January 2016). "Medical Bedside Training and Healthcare for the Poor in the Würzburg and Göttingen Policlinics in the First Half of the Nineteenth Century". In Dinges, Martin; Jankrift, Kay Peter; Schlegelmilch, Sabine; Stolberg, Michael (eds.). Medical Practice, 1600-1900: Physicians and Their Patients. Clio Medica (Amsterdam, Netherlands). Vol. 96. Leiden: Brill. pp. 207–229. doi:10.1163/9789004303324_011. ISBN 978-90-04-30332-4. PMID 27132372.
- Steigerwald, Joan (2013). "Rethinking Organic Vitality in Germany at the Turn of the Nineteenth Century". In Normandin, Sebastian; Wolfe, Charles T. (eds.). Vitalism and the Scientific Image in Post-Enlightenment Life Science, 1800-2010. History, Philosophy and Theory of the Life Sciences. Vol. 2. Dordrecht: Springer Netherlands. pp. 51–75. doi:10.1007/978-94-007-2445-7_3. ISBN 978-94-007-2444-0.
- Sticker, Georg (1932). "Entwicklungsgeschichte der Medizinischen Fakultät an der Alma Mater Julia". In Buchner, Max (ed.). Aus der Vergangenheit der Universität Würzburg: Festschrift zum 350jährigen Bestehen der Universität (in German). Berlin: Springer. pp. 383–757. ISBN 978-3-642-99578-1. OCLC 238793138.
- Verwaal, Ruben E. (2020). Bodily fluids, chemistry and medicine in the eighteenth-century Boerhaave School. Palgrave studies in medieval and early modern medicine. Cham Basingstoke: Palgrave Macmillan. ISBN 978-3-030-51540-9.
- Wiesing, Urban (1989). "Der Tod der Auguste Böhmer. Chronik eines medizinischen Skandals, seine Hintergründe und seine historische Bedeutung". History and Philosophy of the Life Sciences (in German). 11 (2): 275–295. ISSN 0391-9714. JSTOR 23330352.
