= Dietrich Tiedemann =

German philosopher (1748–1803)

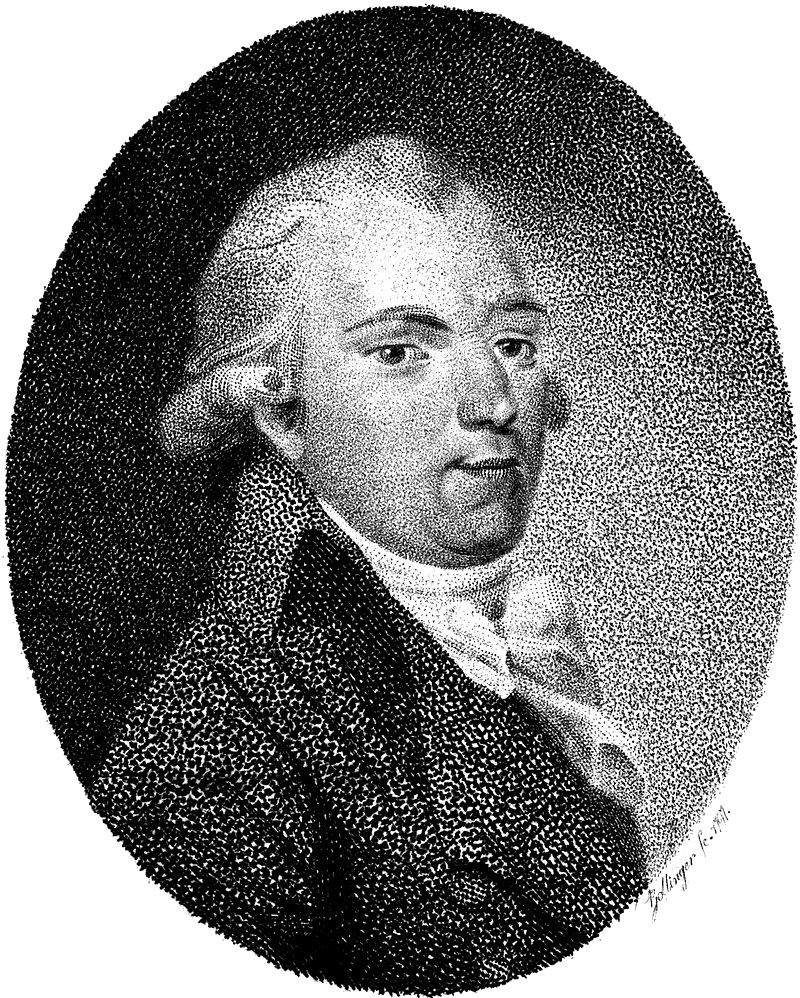
Dietrich Tiedemann

Dietrich Tiedemann (3 April 1748, Bremervörde – 24 May 1803, Marburg) was a German philosopher and historian of philosophy born in Bremervörde. He was father to physiologist Friedrich Tiedemann (1781–1861).

== Biography ==
He studied theology and philosophy at the University of Göttingen, and later was a professor at Collegium Carolinum in Kassel (from 1776) and at the University of Marburg (from 1786).

Tiedemann's system was based on the metaphysics of Leibniz and the epistemology of Locke. He was author of the six-volume Geist der spekulativen Philosophie von Thales bis Berkeley ("The Spirit of Speculative Philosophy from Thales to Berkeley").

Tiedemann had strong disagreements in regard to the philosophic doctrines of Immanuel Kant (1724-1804), of which he critiqued in two publications; "On the Nature of Metaphysics: An Examination of Professor Kant's Principles-Against the Aesthetic" and "Continuation of the Examination of Professor Kant's Thoughts About the Nature of Metaphysics-Against the Analytic". Kant dismissed Tiedemann's arguments, which he reasoned were caused by a lack of understanding.

Tiedemann was a pioneer of empirical psychology, and an early practitioner in regard to scientific study of child development. He kept a journal of his son's sensory, motor, language, and cognitive behavior during the first thirty months of his life. Through empirical observation, he claimed that children possessed a "pre-linguistic knowledge".

== Selected publications ==
- Versuch einer Erklärung des Ursprunges der Sprache (1772) – "Essay Explaining the Origin of Language"
- System der stoischen Philosophie, three volumes (1776) – "System of Stoic Philosophy"
- Über die Natur der Metaphysick, zur Prüfung von Herrn Prof. Kants Grundsätzen (1785)
- Geist der spekulativen Philosophie von Thales bis Berkeley (1791–97) – "The Spirit of Speculative Philosophy from Thales to Berkeley"
- Theätet; oder, Über das menschliche Wissen; ein Beitrag zur Vernunft-Kritik (1794) – "Theaetetus; About Human Knowledge, a Contribution to the Critique of Reason"
