= Gustav Nikolaus Tiedemann =

Gustav Nikolaus Tiedemann (February 17, 1808 Landshut, Bavaria - August 11, 1849 Rastatt) was a German soldier who joined the revolutionaries during the Revolutions of 1848 in Germany, eventually becoming the commander of the last holdout of the revolution, the fortress at Rastatt.

== Biography ==
He was the son of Friedrich Tiedemann, an eminent anatomist and physiologist and professor at Heidelberg University. After completing high school in Mannheim, on a suggestion from an uncle, he attended a military school. From there, he worked his way up to appointments as regimental adjutant in two locations in succession. Then he entered veterinary school and was trained in English at the royal stables in Hannover. Through conflicts with superiors, he ended up in prison and resigned from the service in 1833. He then entered the Greek service as an under officer and again became a regimental adjutant and finally director of the military school in Piræus. Then a change of administration in 1843 deprived all foreigners of their posts, and having a Greek wife, he looked to find another occupation in Greece. This was unsuccessful, and in 1847 he returned to Germany hoping to find something in the postal or railroad service. This did not work out either, and his wife started getting homesick, so he returned to Greece in 1848, shortly after inducing some peasants to lay down their arms in Heidelberg. Again he failed to find an occupation in Greece.

After a year, in 1849, he was in Baden thinking of entering the Schleswig-Holstein service. Instead he became a revolutionary, his younger brother having married a sister of Friedrich Hecker. He was appointed a major and belonged to the staffs of Franz Sigel and Ludwig Mieroslawski. He took part in a battle near Neckar, but then went to Karlsruhe as he did not feel well. There he displeased Mieroslawski by seeking the discharge of incapable adventurers from the service. He was put into custody and taken to Rastatt. Once the defense against the Prussians had failed outside the fortress on June 30 — the same day Carl Schurz entered the fortress — Sigel appointed him as fortress commander. Sigel himself evacuated with the rest of the unsuccessful revolutionary army. Tiedemann's duties mostly consisted in suppressing the residents and soldiers who wanted to surrender the fortress.

After the surrender, he was tried by a Prussian court martial and shot. Prussia visited a similar punishment on his brother.

== See also ==
- Otto von Corvin (another, and somewhat more fortunate, inhabitant of the fortress of Rastatt during Tiedemann's administration)
