= Orgelbau Vleugels =

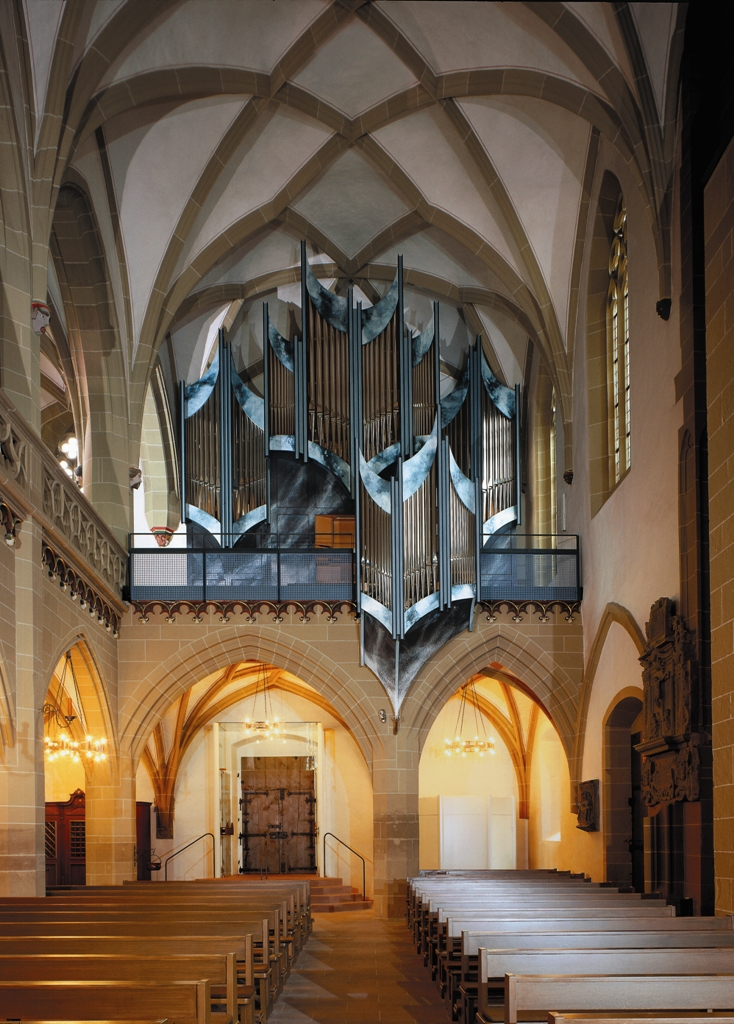
St. Johannes, Kitzingen; front coloration Jacques Gassmann

Orgelbau Vleugels is a pipe organ company producing organs in modern design and restoring historic instruments. The workshop is located in Hardheim, Germany. The owner is master pipe organ builder Hans-Georg Vleugels. The company has a history spanning over 150 years.

== History ==
Pipe organ manufacturing in Hardheim has existed since 1855, when organ-builder Ignaz Dörr started his own workshop. In 1958 Orgelbaumeister Hans Theodor Vleugels (born 1931) took over Maximilian Bader's workshop and two years later his brother's Wilhelm Bader. From 1960 to 1966 Paul Mund and Hans Theodor Vleugels led the company together. In 1967 Hans Theodor Vleugels founded the Orgelbau-Vleugels GmbH. While following traditional south German models, the company initially built instruments incorporating modern technologies such as electric stop action. Cases had very contemporary designs, such as the organ in Cologne-Gremberg, set on a mushroom-shaped concrete pedestal, or in another organ that has free hanging steel frame with plexiglass used for the swell box and rollerboards, thus enabling a free view into the workings of the instrument. During the 1970s the firm abandoned the use of tropical woods and laminates in favour of solid woods, and electric action likewise was discarded in favor of mechanical action. While continuing to build new organs in the 1980s the firm began to devote attention to the restoration of older instruments, including organs of the South German Baroque, and Romantic instruments with valve chests and pneumatic actions. in 1988 the company moved into a large, open, and modern shop; that same year, Hans-Georg Vleugels (born in Stuttgart in 1958) became director of the firm. In 1991 Hans-Georg Vleugels took over the company chair and currently runs the company together with his son Johannes D.C. Vleugels (born 1983) in the second and third generation. Today there are three generations of master pipe organ builders in the Vleugels family working together.

Developments during the 1990s included the restoration of several important concert hall organs: Görlitz Stadthalle (1910 Sauer organ; 1991; 4/71); Heidelber Stadthalle (4/56); and Prague, Smetana-Saal (1912 Voit und Söhne, 1995–96; 3/70). The construction of large instruments in a late-nineteenth-century style was also completed at Aschaffenburg, Herz-Jesu Kirche (1995; 4/63); Munich, Bürgersaalkirche (1994; 3/50); Kitzingen, Stadtpfarrkirche St. Johannes (1996; 3/54); and Jülich, Probsteikirche (1998; 3/45). The Jülich organ contains accessories including thunder rolls, rain machine, and a croaking bullfrog. Vleugels also built new organs in the South German style in historic cases at Würzburg, Käppele (1991; 2/31) and Schäftlarn Benediktinerabtei (1996; 2/31). There were new directions in constructing cases using special materials - a glass case for the Christopherus-Kapelle of the Franz-Josef-Strauss airport in Munich (1/6) - and dramatic artistic effects with contemporary painting as in Kitzingen, Stadtpfarrkirche St. Johannes (1996; 3/54) and Runding, St. Andreas (1998, 2/36). Finally the 1990s saw the restoration of several historic organs in Germany: Gaibach, Heilig-Kreuz-Kapelle (1699 Schleich organ; 1989–90; 1/7); Gaibach, Pfarrkirche (1748 Seuffert organm 1997; 1/12); Mainz Budenheim (1747 Kohlhaas organ); and Laumersheim in der Pfalz (1717 Hoffmann organ).

== Works ==
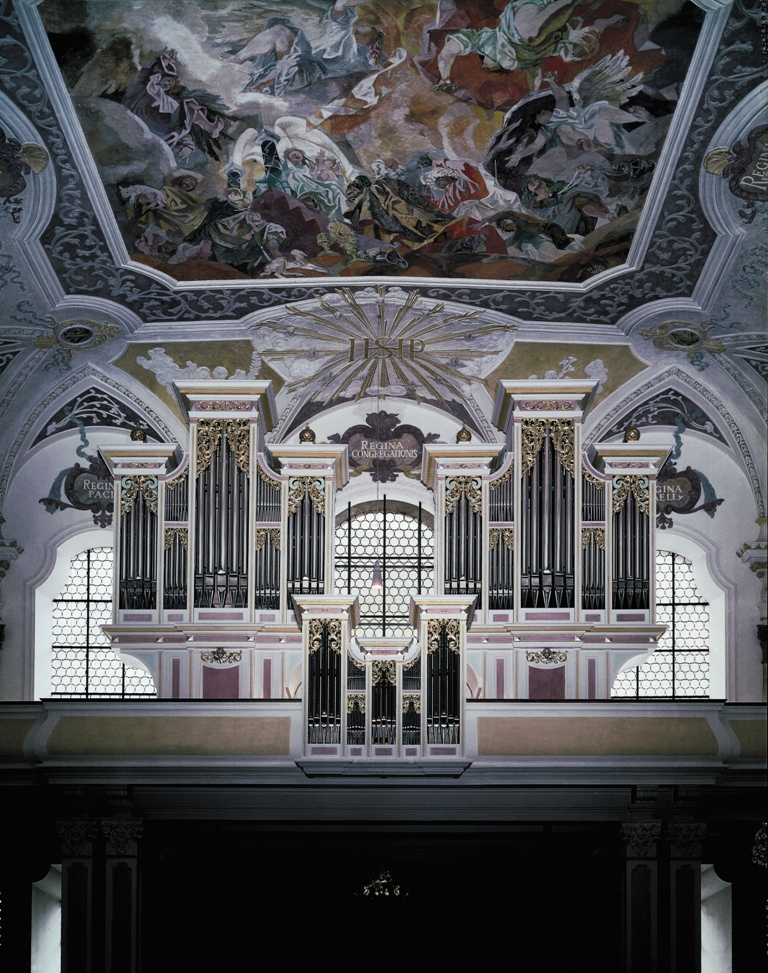
Buergersaal Church, Munich

Initially, the majority of Hans Theodor Vleugels Organs were produced for the Southern German and Swedish markets. In addition to the production of instruments in accordance with classical principals, organ building in Hardheim stepped into new territories and established new accents in the field of organ building. Milestones include organs with electric action, the organ from Cologne-Gremberg, which set on a concrete mushroom shaped pedestal; a new smaller console (i.e. in Sinsheim III/36); and stops set on the side of the console which can be moved around (i.e. in Stuttgart-Möhringen III/37). Another highlight was the restoration of a decaying, but priceless baroque organ case (Walldürn, Basilika III/40). The positioning of a free-hanging organ in a steel frame, the use of Plexiglas for a swell box (expansion chamber), roller boards, and a transparent console were only a few of the features that often caused surprised and sometimes shocked reactions.

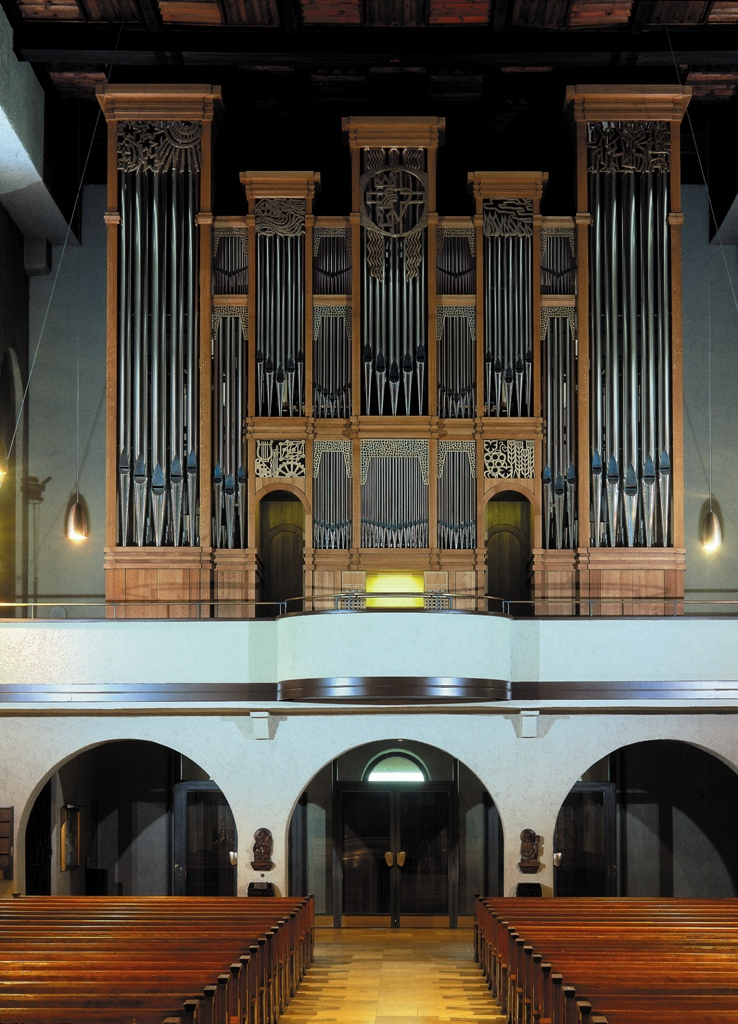
Herz Jesu, Aschaffenburg

In the 1970s the company returned to the use of solid local woods and thus greatly reduced the use of tropical woods and laminates. The use of electric actions was also reduced. In Assamstadt (III/28), the artistic side of the company was further developed with creative pipe placement and paintings.

The 1980s followed with a specialization in the restoration sector. Ever since the end of the 1970s, restoring valve chest organs and pneumatic actions had become fashionable again. In the fight against timber worm and other natural enemies more environmental friendly and material safe techniques, such as gassing, were being used. Also in the 1980s, the company concentrated in voicing in the Southern German baroque style. This characteristic of the instruments was enhanced by restoring old baroque organ pipes. However, organs with a strong, "romantic"-like sound were also inherited. In 1988 the company moved to a larger and more modern workshop and prepared to change leadership. Positive developments under master organ builder Hans-Georg Vleugels (born in Stuttgart 1958) shaped organ building in Hardheim in the 1990s and into the 21st century:

- Restoration of the Europe's most important concert hall organs (Görlitz city hall, IV/71; Heidelberg city hall, IV/56; Prague Smetana Hall, III/70).
- Restoration of the electric action at the Voit organ in the Heidelberg city hall set new standards in restoration of pipe organs from that period.
- New construction of large modern organs modeled after the style of the 19th century. (Aschaffenburg Herz-Jesu Kirche, IV/63; Munich Bürgersaalkirche, III/50; Jülich Probsteikirche, III,45).
- New construction of southern German baroque style organs with historical cases (Würzburg chapel, II/31; Schäftlarn Benediktinerabtei, II/31).
- Ground breaking contemporary organ case design through the use of special materials (i.e. glass case for the chapel of the Munich airport) and colour (Kitzingen St. Johannes III/54, Runding St. Andreas II/36, Bad Tölz Franziskanerkloster II/35, Schifferstadt St. Jakobus III/45, Krefeld Alte Kirche III/42, Geigant St. Bartholomäus II/29).
- The restoration of several of the oldest organs in southern Germany: (Gaibach, Franken, Hl. Kreuzkapelle, Schleich/1699; Gaibach Pfarrkirche, Seuffert/1748; Mainz Budenheim, Kohlhaas/1747; Laumersheim, Pfalz, Hoffmann/1717; Sulzbach, Main, 1710; Bartenstein, Schloßkirche, 1717).
- Experience in restoration of the most famous pipe organs of the romantic period, built by Aristide Cavaillé-Coll and E. F. Walcker Orgelbau

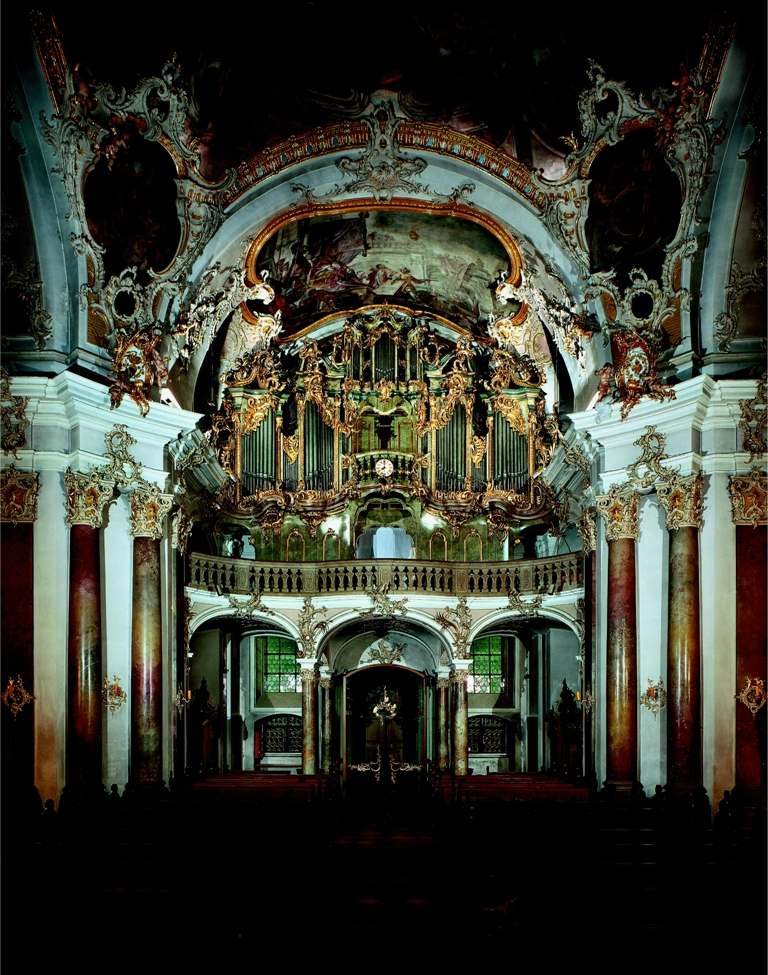
Kaeppele, Wuerzburg

The company currently operates out of a contemporary workshop and uses optimized work-processes consisting of modern machines and CAD. Employees in the design and construction departments produce designs with the latest 3D-software. Special construction techniques allows for quick disassembly in order to save expenses later on.

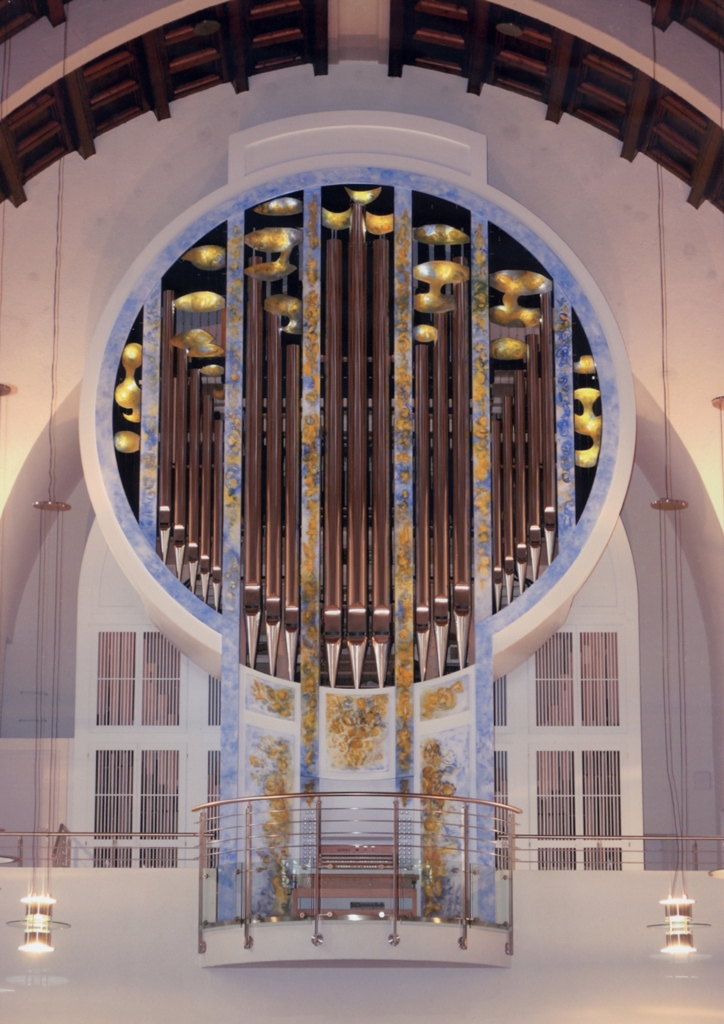
St. Fidelis, Stuttgart

== Organs ==
The opus list, started in 1958, includes more than 400 instruments. These are new instruments as well as extensive restorations:

=== New construction ===
- Schlosskirche, Chemnitz, Germany, III/48, 2006–2011
- Vatican, Vatican-City, Vatican, I/3, 2006
- Juliusspital, Würzburg, Germany, II/29, 2005
- St. Fidelis, Stuttgart, Germany, III/44, 2005
- St. Antonius von Padua, Zernez, Switzerland, I/9, 2005
- Chungdong First Methodist Church, Seoul, South Korea, II/21, 2003
- St. Anna, Blindenmarkt, Austria, III/30, 2002
- St. Johannes, Kitzingen, Germany, III/54, 1996
- Herz Jesu, Aschaffenburg, Germany, IV/63, 1995
- Buergersal Church, Munich, Germany, III/50, 1994
- Kaeppele, Würzburg, Germany, II/31, 1991

=== Restorations ===
- St. Petri, Chemnitz, Germany, III/58, 2008, Ladegast 1888, Jehmlich 1913
- San Francisco el Grande, Madrid, Spain, II/22, 2006 and 2009, Cavaillé-Coll 1883/84
- Holy Cross Church, Loffenau, Germany, II/23, 2004, Walcker 1856
- Smetana-Hall, Prague, Czech Republic, III/70, 1995/96, Voit 1912
- Holy Ghost Church, Schramberg, Germany, II/35, 1994, Späth 1925
- City-Concert Hall, Heidelberg, Germany, III/56, 1993, Voit 1903/10
- City-Concert-Hall, Görlitz, Germany, IV/71, 1991, Sauer 1910
- Holy-Cross-Chapel, Gaibach, Germany, I/7, 1989/90, Schleich 1699/1702
