= Adam Kaspar Hesselbach =

German surgeon and anatomist

- Born: 15 January 1788; Würzburg
- Died: 7 May 1856 (aged 68)
- Scientific career
- Fields: surgeon anatomist

Adam Kaspar Hesselbach (15 January 1788 – 7 May 1856) was a German surgeon and anatomist. He is the son of Franz Kaspar Hesselbach. In 1818 Hesselbach became a Dr. phil. et medicinae in Würzburg. After that he was a professor for surgery in Würzburg (1828-1833) and Bamberg (1836-1843).

== Works ==
- Beschreibung des menschlichen Auges (description of the human eye), 1820
- Beschreibung der pathologischen Präparate, welche in der königlichen anatomischen Anstalt zu Würzburg aufbewahrt werden (description of the pathologic compounds, which are at the royal anatomic institute of Würzburg), 1824
- Die sicherste Art des Bauchschnitts in der Leiste (the safest art of an abdominal cut in the groin), 1819
- Die Lehre von den Eingeweidebrüchen (theory of the ruptures), 1829/30.
