= Bernhard Heine =

German physician, bone specialist and inventor of the osteotome

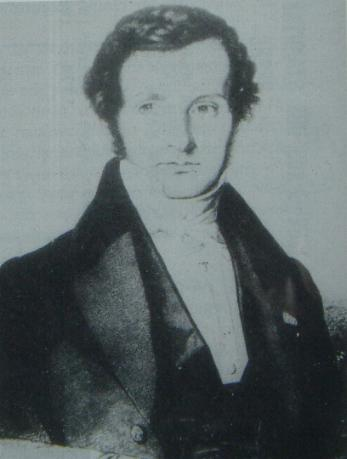
- The German physician Bernhard Heine
- Born: 20 August 1800; Schramberg, Holy Roman Empire
- Died: 31 July 1846 (aged 45); Thun, Switzerland

Bernhard Heine (20 August 1800, Schramberg (Black Forest) – 31 July 1846, Glockenthal near Thun (Switzerland)) was a German medical doctor, bone specialist and the inventor of the osteotome, a medical tool for cutting bones.

== Apprenticeship in Würzburg ==
Bernhard Heine was born on 20 August 1800, the son of a tanner in Schramberg. At the age of ten (according to other references, thirteen) years he was apprenticed to his uncle Johann Georg Heine in Würzburg as an orthopaedic mechanic. Without any enrolment he later attended lectures in medicine at the University of Würzburg.

After a number of journeys he took over his own department in his uncle's orthopaedic institute. When Johann Georg moved to the Netherlands in 1829, Bernhard - together with his cousin Joseph Heine - became the head of the Würzburg institution.

In 1837 Bernhard Heine married his cousin (Johann Georg's daughter) Anna Heine (born 1801).

== Inventing the osteotome ==
In 1830, after years of research and development, Heine presented a medical tool to his colleagues. It was a "bone saw", which he called the "osteotome", and which revolutionized surgical treatment. His invention was a great success among medical experts all over Europe. Heine travelled to other parts of Germany, and to France and Russia to present it to other surgeons. In 1836 a doctoral thesis on the "Osteotome and its application" was published in Munich.

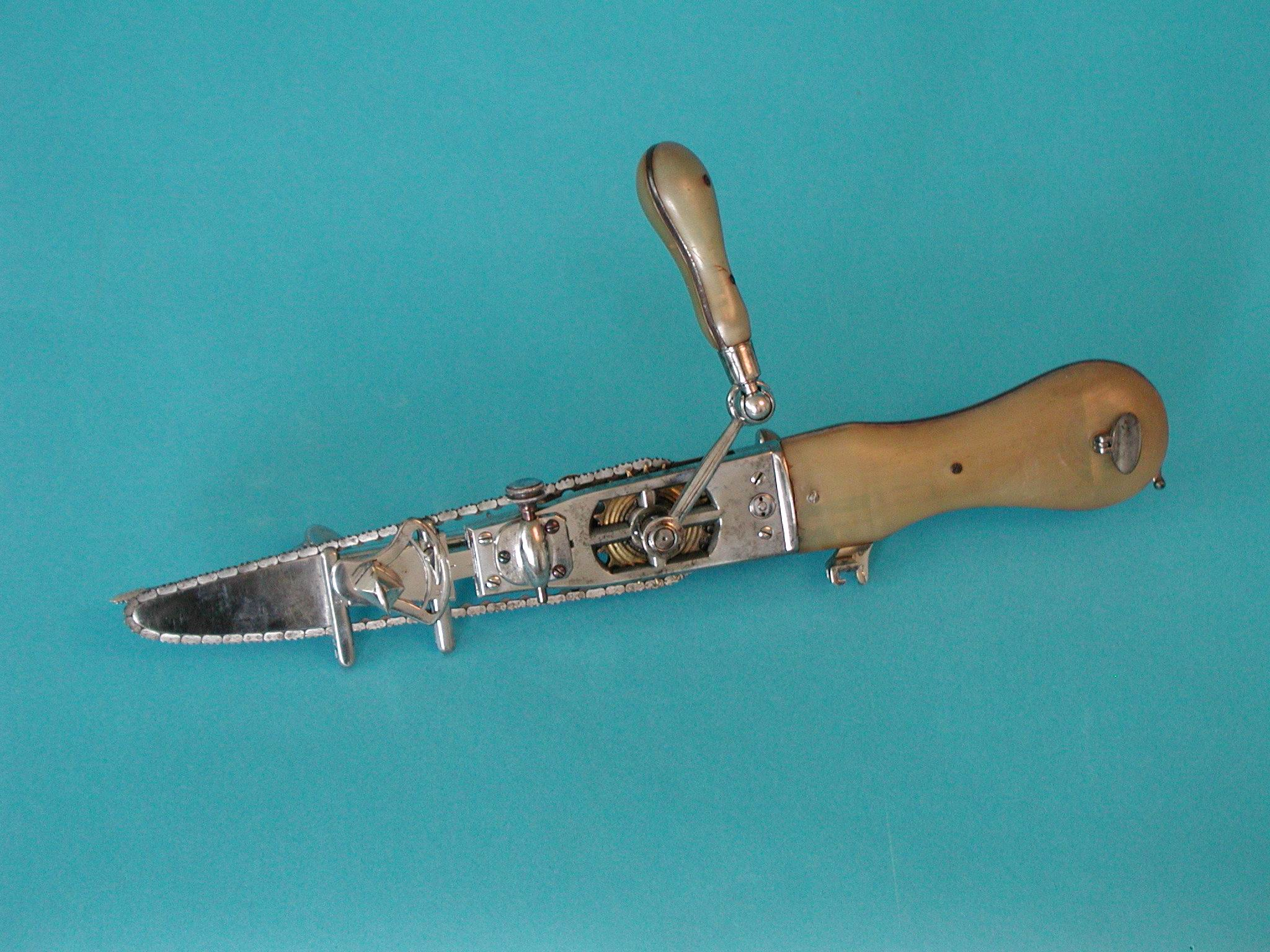
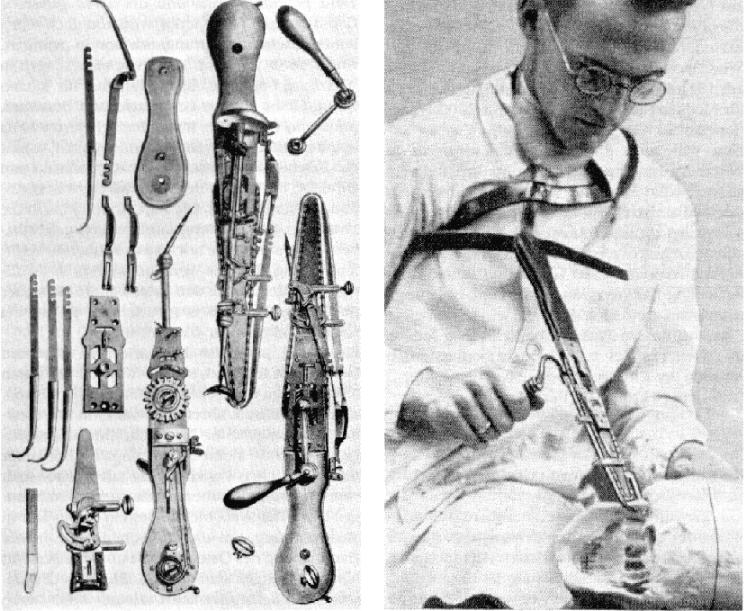

left: the osteotome	right: its various parts and its usage

Heine declined an offer of the Russian Tsar Nicholas I to take over the position of an orthopaedic senior consultant at the imperial school in Kronstadt and returned to Würzburg. The University of Würzburg awarded him an honorary doctorate in 1836 and an honorary professorship in 1838, although he had never acquired any degree.

== Research work on bone formation ==
Heine acquired valuable knowledge in the field of bone formation and bone regeneration, which is still valid today. He was able to prove that the periosteum, the tissue covering the bones, is decisive in bone regeneration and therefore has to be spared violation in the operating process. From 1844 he was an associate professor at the University of Würzburg, teaching experimental physiology.

== Death and legacy ==
He fell ill with tuberculosis and died on 31 July 1846 while on holiday in Glockenthal near Thun in Switzerland. His early death did not allow him to publish his findings; it was not until 1926, eighty years after his death, that his research findings were published (see external link biography).

== Bibliography ==
- Heinz Hansen: Die Orthopädenfamilie Heine - Leben und Wirken der einzelnen Familienmitglieder im Zeichen einer bedeutenden deutschen Familientradition des neunzehnten Jahrhunderts. doctoral thesis, Dresden 1993
- Hans Hekler: Bernhard Heine – von Königen geehrt und von Zar Nikolaus umworben. in: D'Kräz (Beiträge zur Geschichte der Stadt und Raumschaft Schramberg) Heft 10, Schramberg 1990 (also online, see external links)
