= Osteotome =

Surgical instrument for cutting or preparing bone

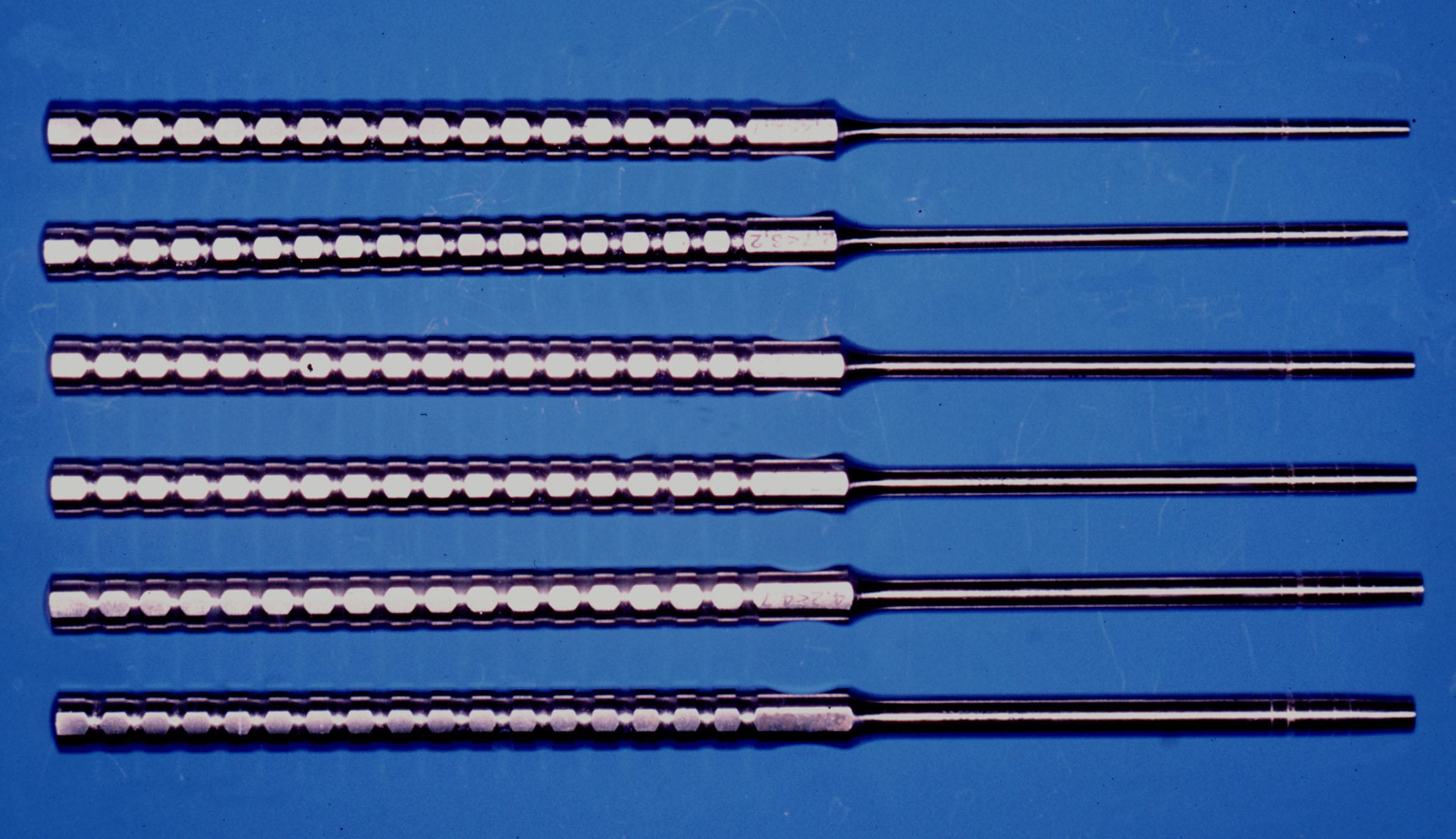
Osteotomes used in dental implantation

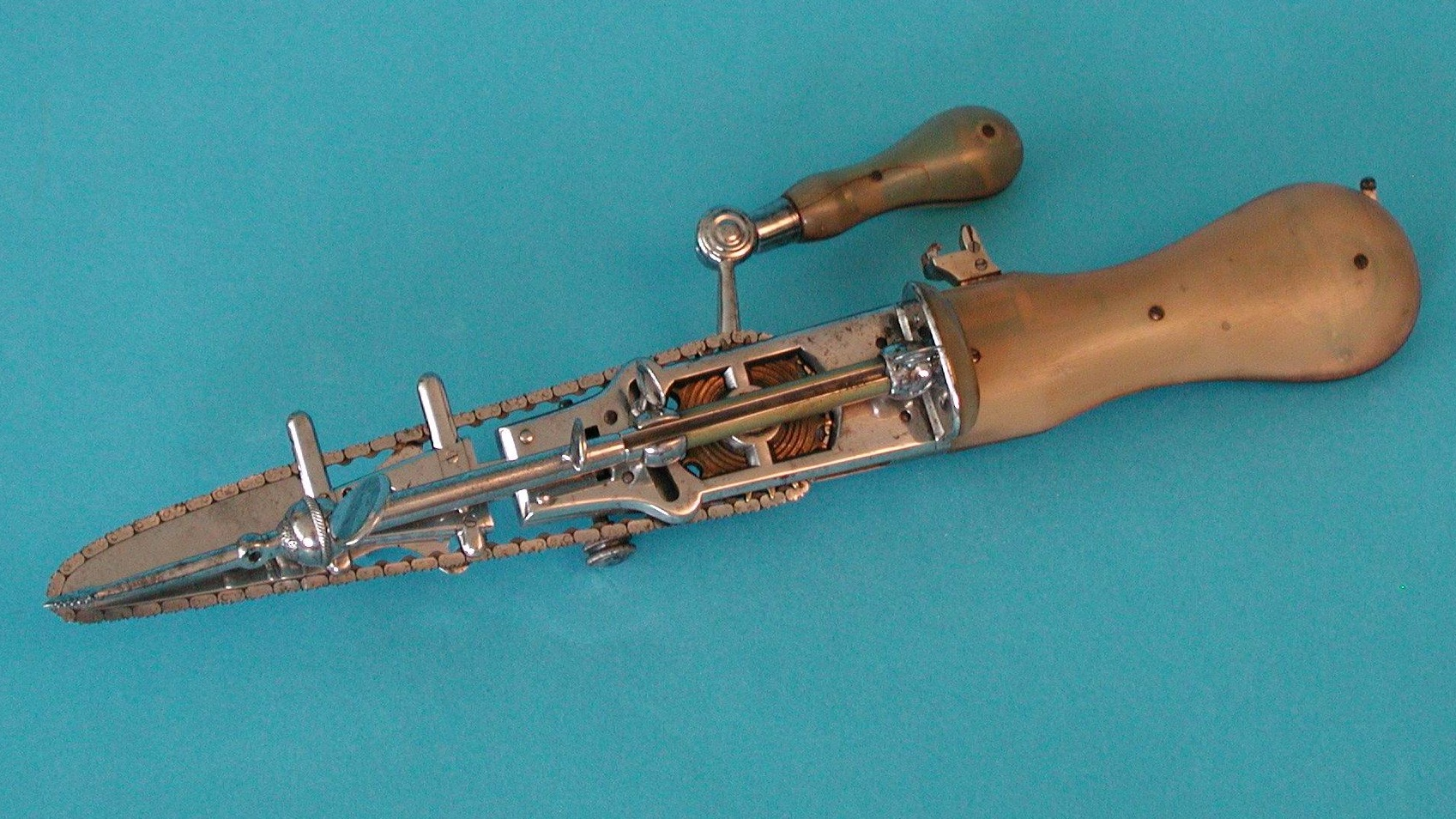
Bernhard Heine's osteotome

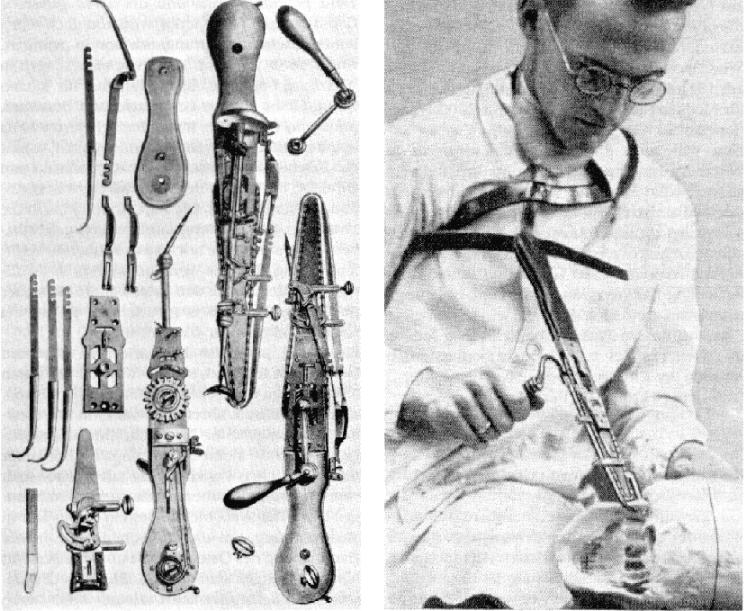
Component parts of the osteotome, and the instrument in use

An osteotome is an instrument used for cutting or preparing bone. Osteotomes are similar to a chisel but bevelled on both sides. They are used today in plastic surgery, orthopedic surgery and dental implantation. In dentistry the term is applied to instruments that prepare the implant site by compacting and displacing bone rather than by cutting it away, a usage that differs from the cutting instruments of orthopaedic surgery.

The chain osteotome, originally referred to simply as the osteotome, was invented by the German physician Bernhard Heine in 1830. This device is essentially a small chainsaw.

== Use in dental implantation ==
In implant dentistry the osteotome is not primarily a cutting instrument. Instruments described as osteotomes in this field prepare the implant site by compacting and laterally displacing bone rather than by removing it. The approach was introduced by Robert B. Summers in 1994 as the osteotome technique.

A graduated set of tapered or concave-tipped osteotomes of increasing diameter is advanced into the soft trabecular bone of the posterior maxilla by tapping with a mallet, so that bone is compressed against the walls of the site rather than cut away. Because bone is conserved, the technique avoids the heat generated by rotary drilling, increases the density of the bone surrounding the implant and can improve primary stability. The same instruments are also used to widen a narrow alveolar ridge before implant placement, a procedure referred to as ridge expansion or bone spreading.

Osteotomes are further used for transcrestal, or internal, sinus floor elevation, commonly abbreviated OSFE. The instrument is used to infracture the floor of the maxillary sinus through the implant site and to raise the overlying sinus membrane, also known as the Schneiderian membrane, without opening a lateral window in the sinus wall. This allows longer implants to be placed where the height of the residual bone is limited, and is less invasive than the lateral window approach.

More recently, rotary instruments used in osseodensification have been proposed as an alternative to hand-driven osteotomes for the same purposes.

== See also ==
- Instruments used in general surgery
- Sinus lift
