= Franz Kaspar Hesselbach =

German surgeon and anatomist

- Born: 27 January 1759; Hammelburg
- Died: 24 July 1816 (aged 57)
- Scientific career
- Fields: surgeon anatomist

Franz Kaspar Hesselbach (27 January 1759 – 24 July 1816) was a German surgeon and anatomist who was a native of Hammelburg.

He was a pupil, and later Prosector under Carl Caspar von Siebold (1736–1807) at Würzburg. Later Hesselbach was a lecturer at Würzburg, where one of his students was Konrad Johann Martin Langenbeck (1776–1851). His son, Adam Kaspar Hesselbach (1788–1856) was also a surgeon.

As a surgeon, Hesselbach is best known for his work with hernia operations. He was the first to describe a handful of anatomical structures, such as the cribriform fascia (Hesselbach's fascia), interfoveolar ligament (Hesselbach's ligament) and the inguinal triangle (Hesselbach's triangle).

== Selected writings ==
- Anatomisch-chirurgische Abhandlung über den Ursprung der Leistenbrüche. Würzburg, Baumgärtner, 1806. (Hesselbach's fascia, ligament and triangle described).
- Neueste anatomisch-pathologische Untersuchungen über den Ursprung und das Fortschreiten der Leisten- und Schenkelbrüche. Würzburg, Staheliano, 1814. (Latest anatomic-pathologic investigations involving the origin and progress of inguinal and femoral ruptures).
