= Joseph Heine =

German physician and civil servant

Joseph (von) Heine (28 November 1803 – 4 November 1877) was a German medical doctor and a high civil servant in the Bavarian health service in the Rheinkreis.

When Johann Georg Heine left Würzburg and his family in 1829 to settle in the Netherlands it must have been shocking for his son Joseph. When Johann Georg wanted him to take over a hospital in Brussels he rejected the offer and rather completed his medical education in other European cities. He was greatly concerned when he learned about his father's efforts in branches of medicine he was not qualified for. There was only one meeting of father and son in 1838, shortly before the father's death. Johann Georg was already very sick and Joseph wanted to help him. However, he had to realize that his father stubbornly insisted on curing himself with dubious methods. In a publication four years later, Joseph Heine harshly criticized his father for leaving his family and for trying unscholarly methods of medical treatment, but also praised his merits as an outstanding orthopedist.

On his way through, Anselm visited Heine in Germersheim, to "get money for the journey out of him", but, in a letter to his mother, had to admit later: "Heine was sullen, and I had to say farewell, politely, at once, I am very sick and tired of him."

== Bibliography ==
- Hekler, Hans: Joseph Heine – Mediziner, Politiker und Kunstmäzen
  in D'Kräz (Beiträge zur Geschichte der Stadt und Raumschaft Schramberg) Heft 13, Schramberg 1993
  (also online, see external links)
- Hansen, Heinz: Die Orthopädenfamilie Heine - Leben und Wirken der einzelnen Familienmitglieder im Zeichen einer bedeutenden deutschen Familientradition des neunzehnten Jahrhunderts, doctoral thesis, Dresden 1993
