= Carl Caspar von Siebold =

German surgeon and obstetrician (1736–1807)

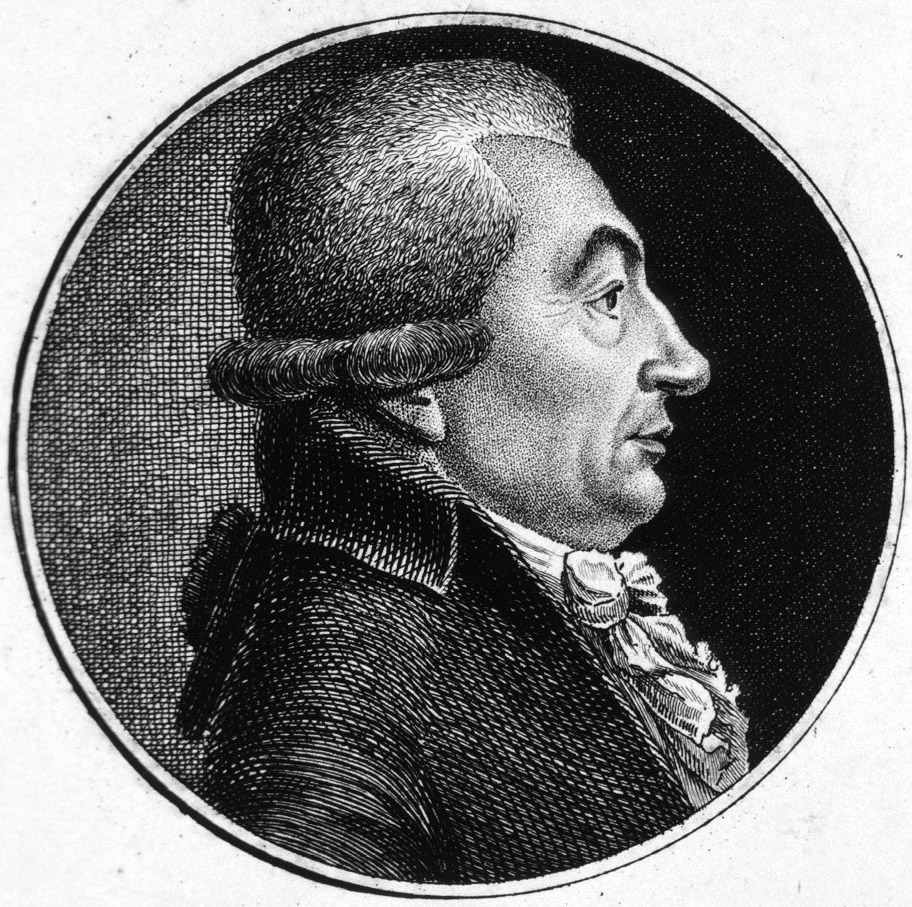
Carl Caspar von Siebold

Carl Caspar von Siebold (4 November 1736 – 3 April 1807) was a German surgeon and obstetrician who was a native of Nideggen in the Duchy of Jülich.

From 1760 to 1763 he studied medicine in Würzburg, and afterwards furthered his medical education in Paris, London and Leiden. In 1769 he became a professor of anatomy, surgery and obstetrics at the University of Würzburg. He remained a professor at Würzburg until his death in 1807. He was grandfather to German naturalist Philipp Franz von Siebold (1796–1866).

In 1776 Siebold was appointed as head physician (Oberwundarzt) of the Juliusspital in Würzburg. Under his leadership at Juliusspital, new surgical techniques were introduced, a regimen of hygiene was established, and renovation of the Theatrum Anatomicum took place. In 1805 the Juliusspital reportedly had the first modern operating room in the world.

Some of Siebold's better known students were Franz Kaspar Hesselbach (1759–1816), Johann Friedrich Meckel (1781–1833) and Nicolaus Anton Friedreich (1761–1836), and Johann Joseph Dömling (1771-1803).
