= Development of the gonads =

Animal organ development

The development of the gonads is part of the prenatal development of the reproductive system and ultimately forms the testicles in males and the ovaries in females.

The immature ova originate from cells from the dorsal endoderm of the yolk sac. Once they have reached the gonadal ridge they are called oogonia. Development proceeds and the oogonia become fully surrounded by a layer of connective tissue cells (pre-granulosa cells). In this way, the rudiments of the ovarian follicles are formed.

In the testicle, a network of tubules fuse to create the seminiferous tubules. Via the rete testis, the seminiferous tubules become connected with outgrowths from the mesonephros, which form the efferent ducts of the testicle. The descent of the testicles consists of the opening of a connection from the testis to its final location at the anterior abdominal wall, followed by the development of the gubernaculum, which subsequently pulls and translocates the testicle down into the developing scrotum. Ultimately, the passageway closes behind the testicle. A failure in this process causes an indirect inguinal hernia.

Germ cells migrate from near the allantois and colonize the primordial gonads. In the female, the germ cells colonise the cortex and become oogonia. In the male, the germ cells colonise the seminiferous cords of the medulla, becoming spermatogonia.

== Before differentiation ==
The first appearance of the gonad is essentially the same in the two sexes, and consists in a thickening of the mesothelial layer of the peritoneum. The thick plate of epithelium extends deeply, pushing before it the mesoderm and forming a distinct projection. This is termed the genital ridge or gonadal ridge. The gonadal ridge, in turn, develops into a gonad. This is a testis in the male and an ovary in the female.

At first, the mesonephros and gonadal ridge are continuous, but as the embryo grows the gonadal ridge gradually becomes pinched off from the mesonephros. However, some cells of mesonephric origin join the gonadal ridge. Furthermore, the gonadal ridge still remains connected to the remnant of that body by a fold of peritoneum, namely the mesorchium in the male or in the female mesovarium. About the seventh week the distinction of sex in the gonadal ridge begins to be perceptible.

== Ovary ==
The ovary is thus formed mainly from the genital ridge and partly from the mesonephros. Later the mass is differentiated into a central part, the medulla of ovary, covered by a surface layer, the ovarian surface epithelium. Between the cells of the epithelium a number of larger cells, the immature ova, are found. The immature ova, in turn, are carried into the stroma beneath by bud-like ingrowths of the surface epthithelium known as cortical cords The ovarian surface epithelium ultimately forms the permanent covering of the ovary. Furthermore, it soon loses its connection with the central mass. Instead, the tunica albuginea of the ovaries develops between them.

=== Origin of ova ===
During early embryonic development, cells from the dorsal endoderm of the yolk sac migrate along the hindgut to the gonadal ridge. These primordial germ cells (PGCs) multiply by mitosis and once they have reached the gonadal ridge they are called oogonia (diploid stem cells of the ovary).

Once oogonia enter this area they attempt to associate with the other somatic cells, derived from both the peritoneum and mesonephros. Development proceeds and the oogonia become fully surrounded by a layer of connective tissue cells (pre-granulosa cells) in an irregular manner. In this way, the rudiments of the ovarian follicles are formed.

During oogenesis, the oogonia become primary oocytes. Oocytes (immature ova) residing in the primordial follicle of the ovary are in a non-growing prophase arrested state, but have the capacity to undergo highly efficient homologous recombinational repair of DNA damages including double-strand breaks. This ability to repair DNA damage allows genome integrity to be maintained and offspring health to be protected.

=== Origin of granulosa cells ===
The embryological origin of granulosa cells remains controversial. In the 1970s, evidence emerged that the first cells to make contact with the oogonia were of mesonephric origin. It was suggested that mesonephric cells already closely associated with the oogonia proliferated throughout development to form the granulosa cell layer.

Recently this hypothesis has been challenged with some thorough histology. Sawyer et al. hypothesized that in sheep most of the granulosa cells develop from cells of the mesothelium (i.e., epithelial cells from the presumptive surface epithelium of the ovary).

=== Descent of the ovaries ===
Just as in the male, there is a gubernaculum in the female, which effects a considerable change in the position of the ovary. The gubernaculum in the female lies in contact with the fundus of the uterus and adheres to this organ, and thus the ovary can only descend as far as to this level. The part of the gubernaculum between the ovary and the uterus ultimately becomes the proper ovarian ligament, while the part between the uterus and the labium majus forms the round ligament of the uterus. A pouch of peritoneum analogous to the vaginal process in the male accompanies it along the inguinal canal: it is called the canal of Nuck.

==== Pathology ====
In rare cases, the gubernaculum may fail to contract adhesions to the uterus, and then the ovary descends through the inguinal canal into the labium majus; under these circumstances, its position resembles that of the testis.

== Testicle ==
The testicle is developed in much the same way as the ovary, originating from mesothelium as well as mesonephros. Like the ovary, in its earliest stages it consists of a central mass covered by a surface epithelium. In the central mass a series of cords appear, and the periphery of the mass is converted into the tunica albuginea, thus excluding the surface epithelium from any part in the formation of the tissue of the testis. The cords of the central mass run together toward the future hilum and form a network which ultimately becomes the rete testis. On the other hand, the seminiferous tubules are developed from the cords distal to the hilum, and between them connective-tissue septa extend. Via the rete testis, the seminiferous tubules become connected with outgrowths from the mesonephros, which form the efferent ducts of the testicle.

=== Descent of the testicles ===
The descent of the testicles consists of the opening of a connection from the testis to its final location at the anterior abdominal wall, followed by the development of the gubernaculum, which subsequently pulls and translocates the testicle down into the developing scrotum. Ultimately, the passageway closes behind the testis. Such descent is ancestral in placental mammals with a derived condition of non-descent with testes remaining near the kidneys occurring in Afrotheria such as elephants.

==== Opening of connection ====
At an early period of fetal life the testicles are placed at the back part of abdominal cavity, behind the peritoneum, and each is attached by a peritoneal fold, the mesorchium, to the mesonephros. From the front of the mesonephros a fold of peritoneum termed the inguinal fold grows forward to meet and fuse with a peritoneal fold, the inguinal crest, which grows backward from the antero-lateral abdominal wall. The testis thus acquires an indirect connection with the anterior abdominal wall. At the same time, a portion of the peritoneal cavity lateral to these fused folds is marked off as the future vaginal process.

==== Development of gubernaculum ====
Also, in the inguinal crest a structure, the gubernaculum testis, makes its appearance. This is at first a slender band, extending from that part of the skin of the groin which afterward forms the scrotum through the inguinal canal to the body and epididymis of the testicle. As and contains the upper part of the gubernaculum, and ultimately also the internal spermatic vessels; the one below, the plica gubernatrix, contains the lower part of the gubernaculum.

The gubernaculum grows into a thick cord. It ends below at the abdominal inguinal ring in a tube of peritoneum, the vaginal process, which protrudes itself down the inguinal canal. By the fifth month the lower part of the gubernaculum still is a thick cord, while the upper part has disappeared. The lower part now consists of a central core of smooth muscle fibers, surrounded by a firm layer of striated muscle elements, connected, behind the peritoneum, with the abdominal wall.

==== Translocation ====
As the testicles develop, the main portion of the lower end of the gubernaculum is carried, following the skin to which it is attached, to the bottom of this pouch. Other bands are carried to the medial side of the thigh and to the perineum. The tube of peritoneum constituting the vaginal process projects itself downward into the inguinal canal, and emerges at the external inguinal ring, pushing before it a part of the obliquus internus and the aponeurosis of the obliquus externus, which form respectively the cremaster muscle and the external spermatic fascia. The vaginal process forms a gradually elongating pouch, which eventually reaches the bottom of the scrotum, and behind this pouch, the testicle is drawn by the growth of the body of the fetus, for the gubernaculum does not grow proportionately with the growth of other parts, and therefore the testicle, being attached by the gubernaculum to the bottom of the scrotum, is prevented from rising as the body grows, and is instead drawn first into the inguinal canal and eventually into the scrotum. It seems certain also that the gubernacular cord becomes shortened as development proceeds, and this assists in causing the testis to reach the bottom of the scrotum.

==== Closing of connection ====
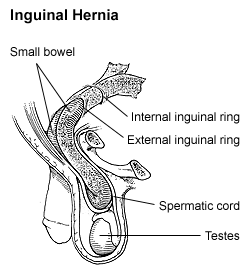
Diagram of an indirect, scrotal inguinal hernia (median view from the left).

By the end of the eighth month, the testicle has reached the scrotum, preceded by the vaginal process, which communicates by its upper extremity with the peritoneal cavity. Just before birth, the upper part of the vaginal process, at the internal inguinal ring, usually becomes closed, and this obliteration extends gradually downward to within a short distance of the testicle. The process of peritoneum surrounding the testis is now entirely cut off from the general peritoneal cavity and constitutes the tunica vaginalis.

==== Male germ cells ====
Male germ cells produced in the testicles can carry out special DNA repair processes that act during meiosis to repair DNA damages and to maintain the integrity of the genomes that are to be transmitted to progeny. These DNA repair processes include homologous recombinational repair and non-homologous end joining.

===== Pathology =====
If the internal inguinal ring does not close properly, then there is a risk that other contents of the abdominal cavity protrudes through the passageway and cause indirect inguinal hernia.

== See also ==
- Sex hormones
- Sexual differentiation in humans
- Hypothalamic–pituitary–gonadal axis
- Streak gonad
- Ovary
- Testicle
- Ovotestis
- Ovotesticular syndrome
- Gonadal dysgenesis
