= Ligament of epididymis =

Ligament of epididymis may refer to:

- Inferior ligament of epididymis
- Superior ligament of epididymis
