= Hydrocele testis =

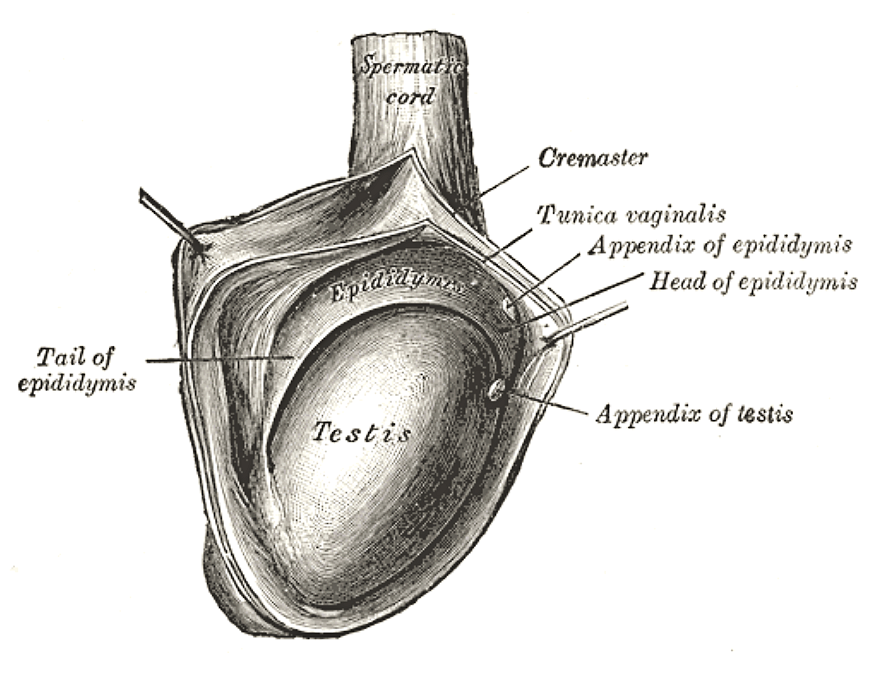
- The right testis, exposed by laying open the tunica vaginalis (Tunica vaginalis is labeled at upper right.)
- Specialty: Urology

A hydrocele testis is an accumulation of clear fluid within the cavum vaginale, the potential space between the layers of the tunica vaginalis of the testicle. It is the most common form of hydrocele and is often referred to simply as a "hydrocele". A primary hydrocele testis causes a painless enlargement in the scrotum on the affected side and is thought to be due to the defective absorption of fluid secreted between the two layers of the tunica vaginalis (investing membrane). A secondary hydrocele is secondary to either inflammation or a neoplasm in the testis.

A hydrocele testis usually occurs on one side, but can also affect both sides. The accumulation can be a marker of physical trauma, infection, tumor or varicocele surgery, but the cause is generally unknown. Indirect inguinal hernia indicates an increased risk of hydrocele testis.

== Signs and symptoms ==
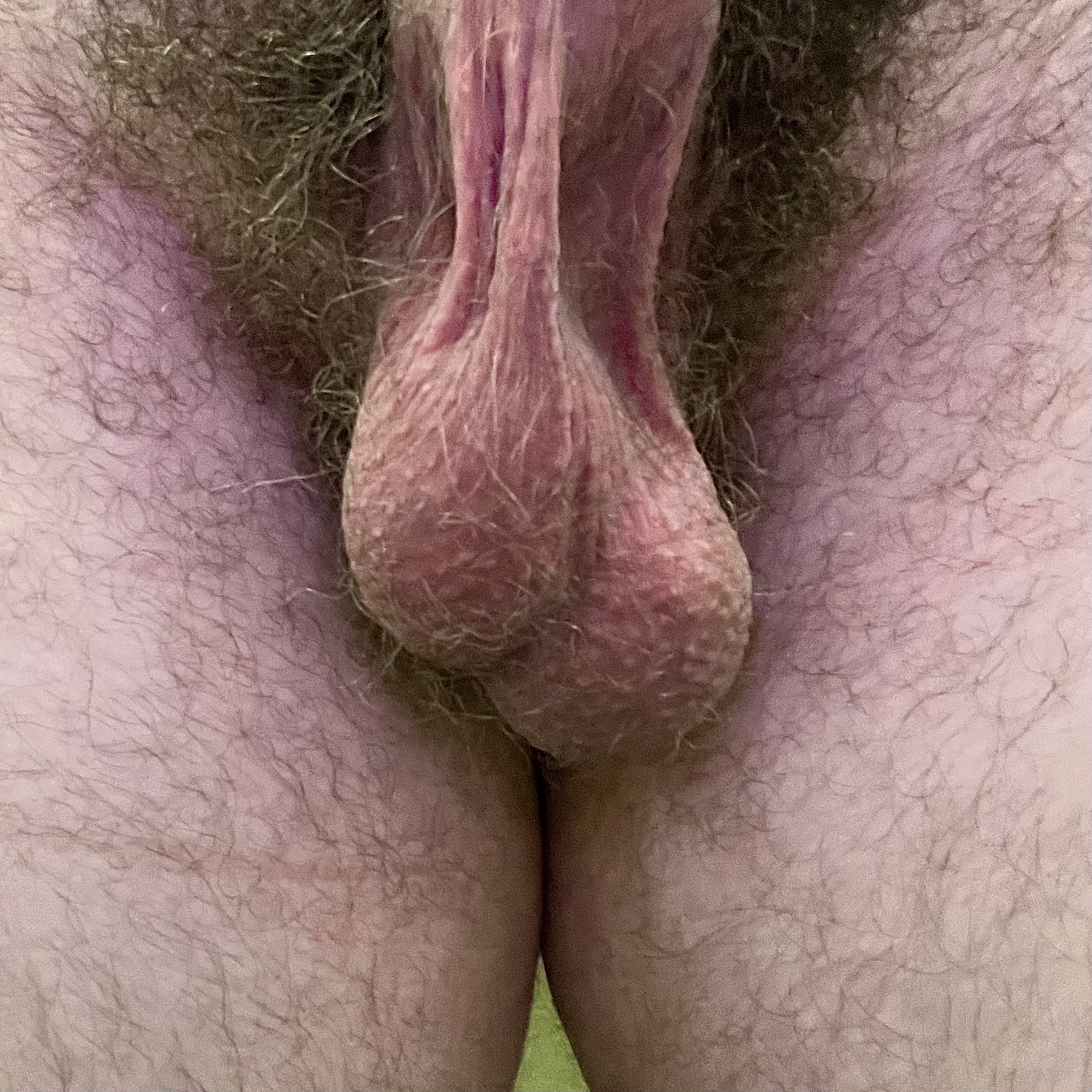
A hydrocele testis as it outwardly presents in an adult male

A hydrocele testis feels like a small fluid-filled balloon inside the scrotum. It is smooth and is mainly in front of the testis. Hydrocele testes vary greatly in size and are typically painless and harmless. However, as the fluid continues to accumulate and the scrotum further enlarges, more discomfort can be expected. Large hydroceles will cause discomfort because of their size. Sometimes pain can be in both testicles as pressure from the enlarged area puts pressure against the unaffected area which can cause discomfort to the normal testicle. It has also been found to decrease a man's sex drive and make him less active for fear of enlarging the mass. As the fluid of a hydrocele testis is transparent, light shone through the hydrocelic region will be visible from the other side. This phenomenon is called transillumination.

Symptoms of a hydrocele testis can easily be distinguished from testicular cancer, as a hydrocele is soft and fluid-filled, whereas testicular cancer feels hard and rough. A hydrocele is differentiated from a varicocele by physical examination (palpation), and if necessary ultrasound.

=== Fertility ===
A hydrocele testis is not generally thought to affect fertility. However, it may be indicative of other factors that may affect fertility.

== Cause ==
During embryogenesis, the testis descends through the inguinal canal, drawing a diverticulum of peritoneum into the scrotum as it descends. This peritoneal tissue is known as the processus vaginalis. Normally, the communication between the processus vaginalis and the peritoneum is obliterated, and the tunica vaginalis is the tissue that remains overlying the testis and the epididymis. Congenital hydrocele testis results when the processus vaginalis remains, allowing fluid from the peritoneum to accumulate in the scrotum.

== Diagnosis ==
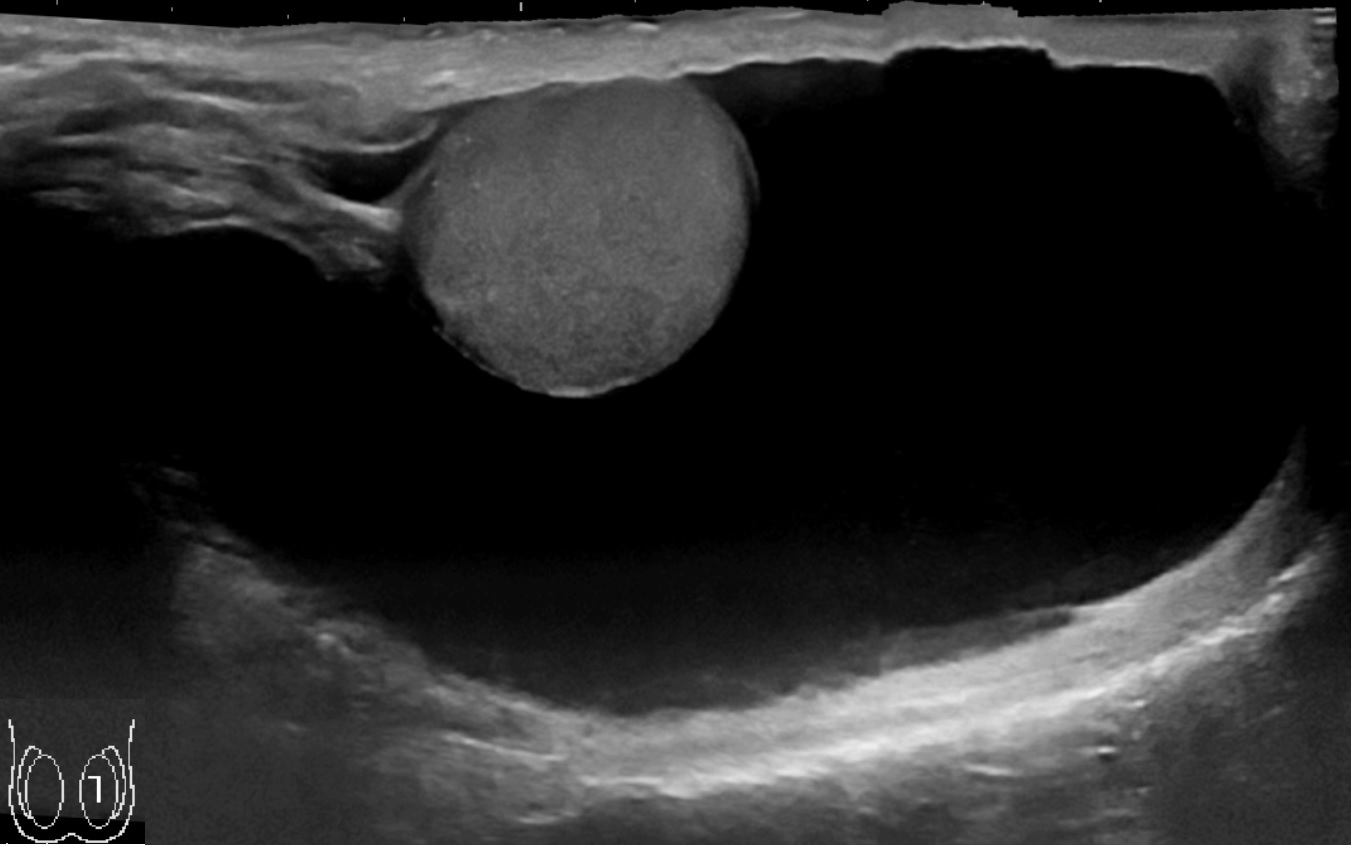
Scrotal ultrasound of a 10 cm large hydrocele testis, with anechoic (dark) fluid surrounding the testicle

Communicating hydrocele testis, caused by the failure of the processus vaginalis closure

Through diagnostic ultrasound the accumulation of fluids can be diagnosed correctly.

== Treatment ==
The fluid accumulation can be drained by aspiration, but this may be only temporary. A more permanent alternative is a surgical procedure, generally, an outpatient ambulatory (same-day) procedure, called a hydrocelectomy. There are two surgical techniques available for hydrocelectomy.

Hydrocelectomy with Excision of the Hydrocele Sac
Incision of the hydrocele sac after complete mobilization of the hydrocele. Partial resection of the hydrocele sac, leaving a margin of 1–2 cm. Care is taken not to injure testicular vessels, epididymis, or ductus deferens. The edge of the hydrocele sac is oversewn for hemostasis (von Bergmann's technique) or the edges are sewn together behind the spermatic cord (Winkelmann's or Jaboulay's technique). Hydrocele surgery with excision of the hydrocele sac is useful for large or thick-walled hydroceles and multilocular hydroceles.
Hydrocele Surgery with Plication of the Hydrocele Sac
The hydrocele is opened with a small skin incision without further preparation. The hydrocele sac is reduced (plicated) by suture Hydrocele surgery: Lord's technique. The plication technique is suitable for medium-sized and thin-walled hydroceles. The advantage of the plication technique is the minimized dissection with a reduced complication rate.

If the hydrocele is not surgically removed, it may continue to grow. The hydrocele fluid can be aspirated. This procedure can be done in a urologist's office or clinic and is less invasive, but recurrence rates are high. Sclerotherapy, the injection of a solution following aspiration of the hydrocele fluid may increase success rates. In many patients, the procedure of aspiration and sclerotherapy is repeated as the hydrocele recurs.
