= Hematocele =

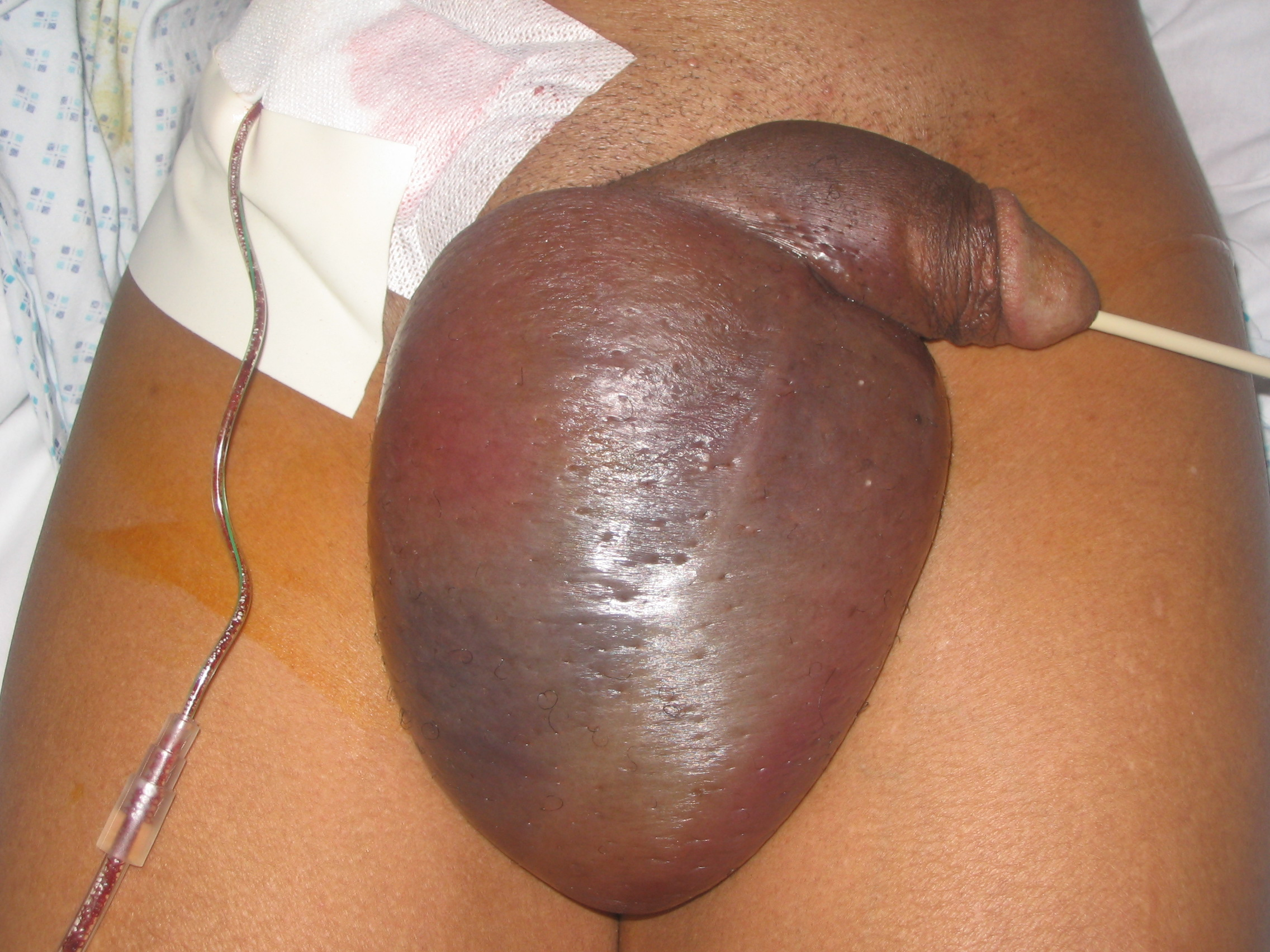
- A massive hemoscrotum (scrotal hematoma) which occurred as a complication of inguinal hernia repair. The scrotum was explored surgically, and a drain was left behind (seen on the right thigh). A Foley catheter is in place to prevent urinary retention.
- Specialty: Urology

A hematocele is a collections of blood in a body cavity or potential space. The term most commonly refers to the collection of blood in the tunica vaginalis around the testes, known as a scrotal hematocele. Hematoceles can also occur in the abdominal cavity and other body cavities. Hematoceles are rare, making them harder to diagnose and treat. They are very common especially as slowly growing masses in the scrotum usually in men older than 50 years.

A scrotal mass is a lump or bulge that can be felt in the scrotum. The scrotum is the sac that contains the testicles. A scrotal mass can be noncancerous (benign) or cancerous (malignant). Benign scrotal masses will include hematocele which is a blood collection in the scrotum.

A scrotal hematocele is also called a hemoscrotum (or haemoscrotum in British English). Scrotal masses are abnormalities in the bag of skin hanging behind the penis (scrotum). The scrotum contains the testicles and related structures that produce, store and transport sperm and male sex hormones.

Hemoscrotum can follow trauma (such as a straddle injury) or can be a complication of surgery. It is often accompanied by testicular pain. It has been reported in patients with hemophilia and following catheterization of the femoral artery. If the diagnosis is not clinically evident, transillumination (with a penlight against the scrotum) will show a non-translucent fluid inside the scrotum. Ultrasound imaging may also be useful in confirming the diagnosis. In severe or non-resolving cases, surgical incision and drainage may be required. To prevent recurrence following surgical drainage, a drain may be left at the surgical site.

== Signs and symptoms ==
Variation in signs and symptoms will depend on the abnormality present and medical history. Variation exists in hematoceles due to the location of the lesion and onset of the hematocele. It is important to seek emergency medical care if developing sudden pain in the scrotum to avoid damage to the testicle that can be permanent. The signs and symptoms listed below are relating to hematoceles and associated conditions that can be due to other causes such as testicular cancer or testicular torsion:

- Unusual lump
- Sudden pain
- Dull aching pain or feeling heavy in the scrotum
- Pain radiating throughout the groin, abdomen, or lower back
- Tender, swollen, or hardened testicle
- Tender, swollen, or hardened epididymis, the soft, comma-shaped tube above and behind the testicle that stores and transports sperm
- Swelling in the scrotum
- Redness of the skin of the scrotum
- Nausea or vomiting

If the cause of the scrotal mass is due to infection then signs and symptoms may be the following:

- Pus
- Pus or blood in the urine
- Fever

== Cause ==
Scrotal masses might be an accumulation of fluids, the growth of abnormal tissue, or normal contents of the scrotum that have become swollen, inflamed or hardened. Scrotal masses could be cancerous or caused by another condition that affects testicular function and health. A hematocele is one of the most common sequelae of testicular trauma. A traumatic hematocele usually results from testicular rupture (80% of cases) or a tear in the pampiniform plexus veins. Testicular rupture and testicular torsion are also common causes of scrotal hematocele. It can also be caused by kidney injury, pancreatitis, hematological dysfunction, or vasculitis.

There are different disorders that can result as a consequence or a hematocele which include:

- Testicular cancer
- Spermatocele
- Epididymitis
- Orchitis
- Hydrocele
- Variocele
- Inguinal hernia
- Testicular torsion

== Pathophysiology ==
Chronic hematocele is rare. The direct cause of hematoceles is still unknown. Hematoceles can be classified into idiopathic and secondary ones. Idiopathic or spontaneous hematoceles give no history of testicular cancer or past trauma to testis, no pain in the organ, and seems to be more common the older population. Secondary hematoceles are usually associated with trauma, surgery, or neoplasm, but can also be caused by hematological alterations, or vasculitis.

Presumably minor trauma results in rupture of dilated microvessels beneath the fibrous capsule.

Hematoceles present as slowly progressing. The duration of swellings of hematoceles can last months to decades. Usually there is no pain, but discomfort and heavyness is most common in the scrotum. In hematocele of recent occurrence the tunica sac contains coagulated fresh blood. A hematocele that begins bleeding into itself, becoming a hemorrhagic cyst, can easily rupture and cause a number of problems. If the hematocele is older, the tunica sac appears filled with spongy material several times larger than the testicular volume. Most of this material is fibrin and cholesterol granulomas . In chronic hematocele the blood clot is totally or partially consisting of connective tissue that contains numerous newly formed blood vessels and hemosiderin-laden macrophages. Connective tissue facing the tunica cavity is lined by fibrin remnants. In its final stages the lesion consists of a thickened, fibrosed, and calcified tunica sac which may also show osseous metaplasia.

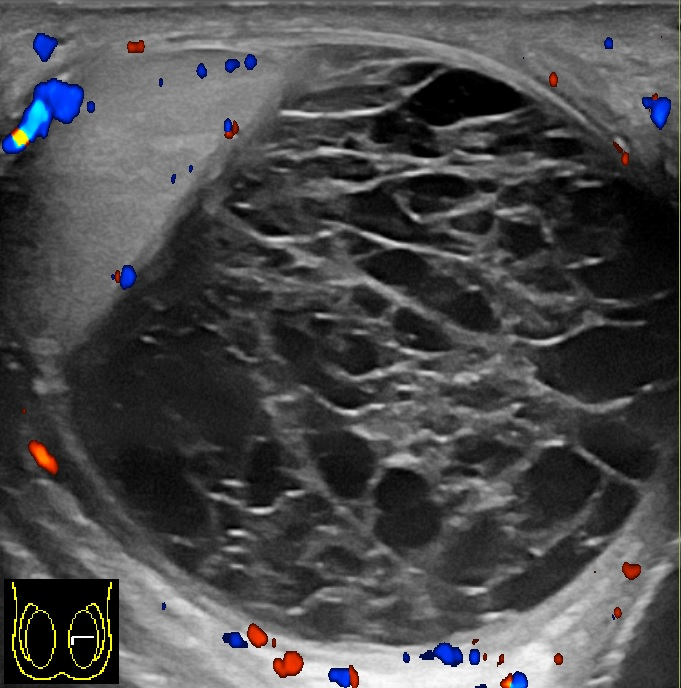
Scrotal ultrasonography of a hematocele, a couple of weeks after appearance, as a fluid volume with multiple thick septations. The hematocele displays no blood flow on Doppler ultrasonography. A pyocele has a similar appearance, but was excluded by lack of inflammation.

== Diagnosis ==
Hematoceles can be a challenge to diagnose since they can mimic cysts or neoplasms. There can different exams used in combination to make a final diagnosis:

- Physical exam
- Ultrasound
- Urine test
- Blood test
- CT scan
- MRI scan

Differential diagnosis of hematocele includes testicular tumor, testicular torsion, and epididymitis. In a blood test or urine test, serum levels of tumor markers such as (alpha-fetoprotein, carcinoembryonic antigen, β-human chorionic gonadotropin) can help to reveal if testicular cancer is present which can help with the differential diagnosis. When there is no certain cause, a diagnosis of idiopathic scrotal hematocele will be made. In the case of chronic idiopathic scrotal hematocele, a history of trauma to the perineum is usually denied, which is a key evidence for the diagnosis of scrotal hematocele that is idiopathic. If no evidence of hematological alterations or vasculitis is present, that can indicate for another possible cause of scrotal hematocele.

== Treatment ==
Most hematoceles will require minor or more serious medical procedures depending on the severity. The repair of a hematocele rupture may be difficult, especially if it is circumferential. This is because in such cases a large portion of parenchyma is herniated and may already be necrotic.

If the hematocele is relatively small and does not cause a lot of pain, conservative treatment such as foot elevation and bed rest may be sufficient. In more severe cases, surgical intervention may become necessary. Surgery may be performed to drain the accumulated blood from the scrotum. If a testicular tumor is found to be the cause of the bleeding, the entire testicle is generally removed to prevent cancer from spreading to other parts of the body. If surgery becomes necessary to treat the hematocele, it may take several weeks for the patient to recover fully from the procedure. This is due to the fact that the scrotum tends to swell after the surgery. This swelling can cause discomfort or pain that does not easily go away. Prescription medications are often given to help the patient recover from the surgery.

Regular medical checkups can help a doctor to look out for any type of hematocele. Early detection is the key in treating most medical conditions. With different types of hematoceles, complications can develop very quickly so it is particularly important to receive an early diagnosis. In order to prevent hematoceles, it is important to have testicular self-exams to help find abnormalities sooner. Doing this can help to understand what is normal in the body and be able to detect abnormalities in the body. This can include examining testicles once a month, especially if the person has had previous testicular cancer or a history of testicular cancer.

== Prognosis ==
The life expectancy of all individuals with hematoceles will depend on the severity and the underlying causes that could have led to hematoceles. Not all hematoceles will result in long term complications. However they can affect the health or function of the testicle that can lead to:

- Delayed or poor development if at a young age
- Infertility

The hematocele severity will depend on whether it is symptomatic or asymptomatic. If surgically removed, the recovery can take weeks, causing such a procedure to be performed only in extreme cases.

== Epidemiology ==
Hematoceles should be cleared quickly to avoid pressure of the atrophy of the parenchyma. Rare complication can results such as infection, suppupation, and scrotal gangrene.

== Research Directions ==
Hematoceles are rare, making them harder to diagnose and treat.

Another case study presents an 18 male that presented with huge painless right sided scrotal mass which was gradually increasing in size and associated with dragging sensation. The case study presents the patient with no history of any trauma or previous surgery, and general physical condition being normal. On examination, right testis was enlarged, hard and non tender with loss of testicular sensation. The pathological diagnosis was consistent with chronic hematocele.

Current research is ongoing for proper diagnosis and helping to differentiate among other conditions. Doppler ultrasound in a retrospective study was shown to be helpful for differential diagnosis of patients with acute scrotum. Accuracy of imaging studies is higher for the differential diagnosis of testicular torsion and epididmo-orchitis, which there can still be the possibility of misdiagnosis for hematoceles due to testicular torsion. Further research in this area shows importance for surgical decision making in hematoceles.

Scrotal masses are a common presentation in primary care, and a painful scrotum accounts for 1% of emergency department visits. As of 2017, there has only been 35 cases reported so far in the known world literature, few scattered case reports published in medical journals of different languages.
