= Superior ligament of epididymis =

Ligament of the epididymis and testis

Details
- From: epididymis
- To: testis

Identifiers
- Latin: ligamentum epididymidis superius

The superior ligament of the epididymis is a strand of fibrous tissue which is covered by a reflection of the tunica vaginalis and connects the upper aspect of the epididymis with the testis.
