= Testicular rupture =

Complication of testicular trauma

Testicular rupture is a tear of the tunica albuginea of the testicle, which may result in extrusion of testicular tissue, including the seminiferous tubules. It is an rare complication of testicular trauma and may result from blunt or penetrating injury, although blunt trauma is the more common mechanism.

Typical symptoms include severe scrotal pain and swelling following trauma. Diagnosis is usually evaluated with scrotal ultrasonography, and rupture is generally treated with surgical exploration and repair, with preservation of viable testicular tissue where possible.

== Diagnosis ==
Testicular rupture can be difficult to diagnose by physical examination because swelling, bruising and tenderness can make the testis difficult to assess. Scrotal ultrasonography is used to examine the injured testis, and it may show irregularity of the testicular contour and heterogeneous testicular tissue. Doppler ultrasonography can also be used to assess blood flow to the testis. If ultrasound findings are inconclusive and rupture cannot be ruled out, surgical exploration is recommended.

== Treatment ==
Testicular rupture is generally treated with surgical exploration, with the aim of preserving as much viable testicular tissue as possible. During surgery, blood clots and hematoma are removed, non-viable testicular tissue is debrided, and the tunica albuginea is closed with absorbable sutures. If the testis cannot be salvaged, orchiectomy may be necessary.

== Prognosis ==
Prompt surgical treatment is associated with high rates of testicular salvage. The American Urological Association guideline reports salvage rates of 80–90% following prompt surgical exploration. Delayed complications can include chronic pain and testicular atrophy. Fertility and testosterone production may also be affected.

== See also ==
- Testicular torsion
