= Canal of Nuck =

Feature of female human reproductive system

Details

Identifiers
- Latin: processus vaginalis peritonei femininus

The canal of Nuck, first described by Anton Nuck (de) in 1691, is an abnormal patent (open) pouch of peritoneum extending into the labia majora of women. It is analogous to a patent processus vaginalis in males (see hydrocele testis, inguinal hernia). In rare cases, it may give rise to a cyst or a hydrocele in women and has potential to develop into an indirect inguinal hernia. The pouch accompanies the gubernaculum during development of the urinary and reproductive organs, more specifically during the descent of the ovaries, and normally obliterates.

== See also ==
- List of homologues of the human reproductive system
