= Inferior ligament of epididymis =

Ligament of epididymis and testis

Details
- From: epididymis
- To: testis

Identifiers
- Latin: ligamentum epididymidis inferius

The inferior ligament of the epididymis is a strand of fibrous tissue which is covered by a reflection of the tunica vaginalis and connects the lower aspect of the epididymis with the testis.
