= Mesorchium =

Structure in the development of testes

- Schematic drawing of a cross-section through the vaginal process. 1 testicle, 2 Epididymis, 3 Mesorchium, 4 Lamina visceralis of Tunica vaginalis, 5 Lamina parietalis of Tunica vaginalis, 6 Cavum vaginale, 7 Mesepididymis, 8 Fascia spermatica interna

The testes, at an early period of foetal life, are placed at the back part of the abdominal cavity, behind the peritoneum, and each is attached by a peritoneal fold, the mesorchium, to the mesonephros.

== See also ==
- mesentery
- mesovarium

Mesorchium is the fibrous sheath which attaches vascular and avascular structures of spermatic cord together.
