= Testicular trauma =

- Specialty: Urology

Injury to the scrotum and testicles caused by a sharp mechanical tool

Testicular trauma is an injury to one or both testicles. Types of injuries include blunt, penetrating, and degloving.

Because the testes are located within the scrotum, which hangs outside of the body, they do not have the protection of muscles and bones. This makes it easier for the testes to be struck, hit, kicked, or crushed, which occurs most often during contact sports. Testicles can be protected by wearing athletic cups during sports.

Trauma to the testes can cause severe pain, bruising, swelling, and/or in severe cases even infertility. In most cases, the testes—which are made of a spongy material—can absorb some impact without serious damage. A rare type of testicular trauma, called testicular rupture, occurs when a testicle receives a direct blow or is squeezed against the hard bones of the pelvis. This injury can cause blood to leak into the scrotum and possibly even infertility and other complications. In severe cases, surgery to repair the rupture—and thus save the testicle—may be necessary.

In at least one case, testicular trauma was reported as the cause of a patient developing systemic inflammatory response syndrome (SIRS) despite otherwise minor trauma.

== See also ==
- Ball-busting
- Groin attack
- Testicular torsion
