= Scrotal ultrasound =

Medical ultrasound examination of the scrotum

Transscrotal ultrasound
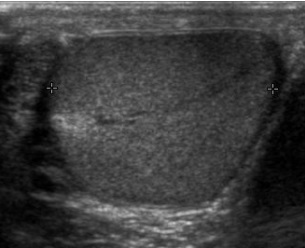
- Sonography of a normal testis. The normal testis presents as a structure having homogeneous, medium level, granular echotexture. The mediastinum testis appears as the hyperechoic region located at the periphery of the testis as seen in this figure.
- ICD-9-CM: 88.79
- OPS-301 code: 3-05c

Scrotal (or transscrotal) ultrasound is a medical ultrasound examination of the scrotum. It is used in the evaluation of testicular pain, and can help identify solid masses.

== Indications ==
Although the development of new imaging modalities such as computerized tomography and magnetic resonance imaging have opened a new era for medical imaging, high-resolution sonography remains as the initial imaging modality of choice for evaluation of scrotal disease. Many of the disease processes, such as testicular torsion, epididymo-orchitis, and intratesticular tumor, produce the common symptom of pain at presentation, and differentiation of these conditions and disorders is important for determining the appropriate treatment. High-resolution ultrasound aids in improved characterization of some intrascrotal lesions and suggests more specific diagnoses, resulting in more appropriate treatments and the avoidance of unnecessary operation.

== Imaging technique ==
For any scrotal examination, thorough palpation of the scrotal contents and history taking should precede the sonographic examination. Patients are usually examined in the supine position with a towel draped over their thighs to support the scrotum. Warm gel should always be used because cold gel can elicit a cremasteric response resulting in thickening of the scrotal wall; hence a thorough examination is difficult to be performed. A high resolution, near-focused, linear array transducer with a frequency of 7.5 MHz or greater is often used because it provides increased resolutions of the scrotal contents. Images of both scrotum and bilateral inguinal regions are obtained in both transverse and longitudinal planes. Color Doppler and pulsed Doppler examination are subsequently performed, optimized to display low-flow velocities, to demonstrate blood flow in the testes and surrounding scrotal structures. In evaluation of acute scrotum, the asymptomatic side should be scanned first to ensure that the flow parameters are set appropriately. A transverse image including all or a portion of both testicles in the field of view is obtained to allow side-to-side comparison of their sizes, echogenicity, and vascularity. Additional views may also be obtained with the patient performing Valsalva maneuver. Online calculators have been introduced to estimate testicular volume based on sonographic measurements.

== Anatomy ==
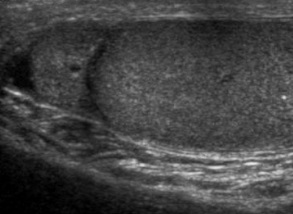
Normal epididymal head. The epididymal head, usually iso- or slightly hyperechoic than the testis is seen located cephalad to the testis.

The normal adult testis is an ovoid structure measuring 3 cm in anterior-posterior dimension, 2–4 cm in width, and 3–5 cm in length. The weight of each testis normally ranges from 12.5 to 19 g. Both the sizes and weights of the testes normally decrease with age. At ultrasound, the normal testis has a homogeneous, medium-level, granular echotexture. The testicle is surrounded by a dense white fibrous capsule, the tunica albuginea, which is often not visualized in the absence of intrascrotal fluid. However, the tunica is often seen as an echogenic structure where it invaginates into the testis to form the mediastinum testis. In the testis, the seminiferous tubules converge to form the rete testes, which is located in the mediastinum testis. The rete testis connects to the epididymal head via the efferent ductules. The epididymis is located posterolateral to the testis and measures 6–7 cm in length. At sonography, the epididymis is normally iso- or slightly hyperechoic to the normal testis and its echo texture may be coarser. The head is the largest and most easily identified portion of the epididymis. It is located superolateral to the upper pole of the testicle and is often seen on paramedian views of the testis. The normal epididymal body and tail are smaller and more variable in position.

The testis obtains its blood supply from the deferential, cremasteric and testicular arteries. The right and left testicular arteries, branches of the abdominal aorta, arise just distal to the renal arteries, provide the primary vascular supply to the testes. They course through the inguinal canal with the spermatic cord to the posterior superior aspect of the testis. Upon reaching the testis, the testicular artery divides into branches, which penetrate the tunica albuginea and arborize over the surface of the testis in a layer known as tunica vasculosa. Centripetal branches arising from the capsular arteries carry blood toward the mediastinum, where they divide to form the recurrent rami that carry blood away from the mediastinum into the testis. The deferential artery, a branch of the superior vesicle artery and the cremasteric artery, a branch of the inferior epigastric artery, supply the epididymis, vas deferens, and peritesticular tissue.

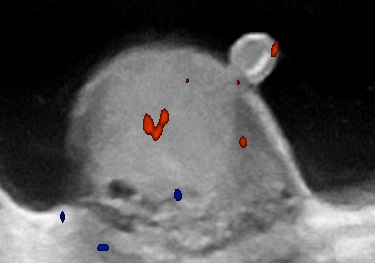
Scrotal ultrasonography with Doppler of an 85-year-old man with hydrocele, making the appendix of the testicle clearly distinctive as a 4 mm outpouching.

Four testicular appendages have been described: the appendix testis, the appendix epididymis, the vas aberrans, and the paradidymis. They are all remnants of embryonic ducts. Among them, the appendix testis and the appendix epididymis are usually seen at scrotal US. The appendix testis is a Müllerian duct remnant and consists of fibrous tissue and blood vessels within an envelope of columnar epithelium. The appendix testis is attached to the upper pole of the testis and found in the groove between the testis and the epididymis. The appendix epididymis is attached to the head of the epididymis. The spermatic cord, which begins at the deep inguinal ring and descends vertically into the scrotum consists of vas deferens, testicular artery, cremasteric artery, deferential artery, pampiniform plexuses, genitofemoral nerve, and lymphatic vessel.

== Intratesticular tumors ==
One of the primary indications for scrotal sonography is to evaluate for the presence of intratesticular tumor in the setting of scrotal enlargement or a palpable abnormality at physical examination. It is well known that the presence of a solitary intratesticular solid mass is highly suspicious for malignancy. Conversely, the vast majority of extratesticular lesions are benign.

=== Germ cell tumors ===
Primary intratesticular malignancy can be divided into germ cell tumors and non–germ cell tumors. Germ cell tumors are further categorized as either seminomas or nonseminomatous tumors. Other malignant testicular tumors include those of gonadal stromal origin, lymphoma, leukemia, and metastases.

==== Seminoma ====
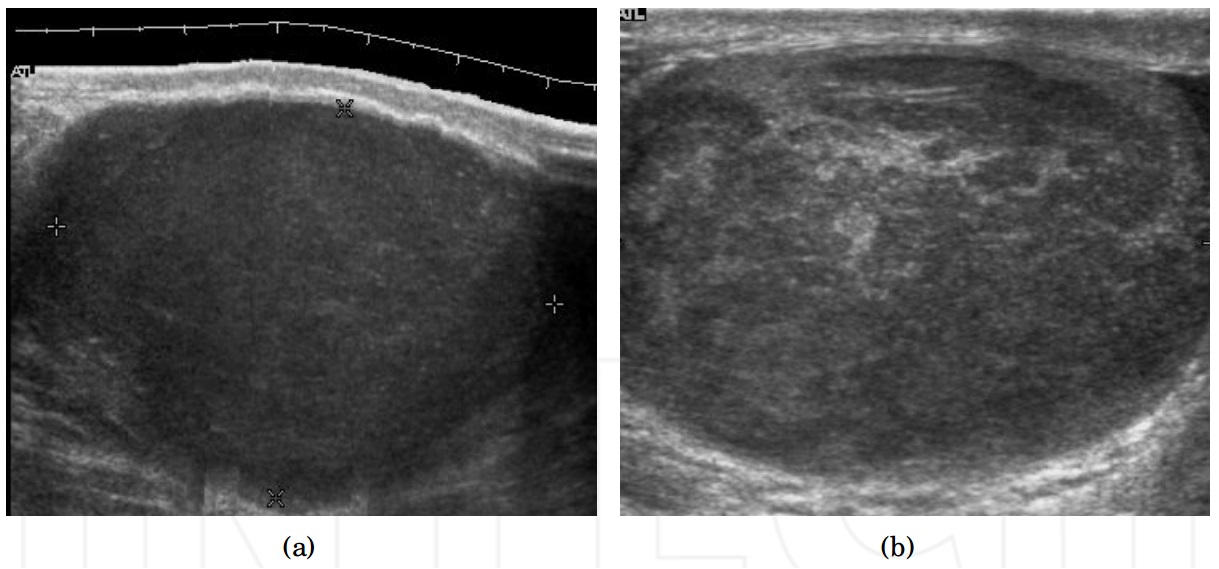
Fig. 3. Seminoma. (a) Seminoma usually presents as a homogeneous hypoechoic nodule confined within the tunica albuginea. (b) Sonography shows a large heterogeneous mass occupying nearly the whole testis but still confined within the tunica albuginea, it is rare for seminoma to invade to peritesticular structures.

Approximately 95% of malignant testicular tumors are germ cell tumors, of which seminoma is the most common. It accounts for 35%–50% of all germ cell tumors. Seminomas occur in a slightly older age group when compared with other nonseminomatous tumor, with a peak incidence in the fourth and fifth decades. They are less aggressive than other testicular tumors and usually confined within the tunica albuginea at presentation. Seminomas are associated with the best prognosis of the germ cell tumors because of their high sensitivity to radiation and chemotherapy.

Seminoma is the most common tumor type in cryptorchid testes. The risk of developing a seminoma is increased in patients with cryptorchidism, even after orchiopexy. There is an increased incidence of malignancy developing in the contralateral testis too, hence sonography is sometimes used to screen for an occult tumor in the remaining testis. On US images, seminomas are generally uniformly hypoechoic, larger tumors may be more heterogeneous [Fig. 3]. Seminomas are usually confined by the tunica albuginea and rarely extend to peritesticular structures. Lymphatic spread to retroperitoneal lymph nodes and hematogenous metastases to lung, brain, or both are evident in about 25% of patients at the time of presentation.

==== Nonseminomatous germ cell tumors ====
Nonseminomatous germ cell tumors most often affect men in their third decades of life. Histologically, the presence of any nonseminomatous cell types in a testicular germ cell tumor classifies it as a nonseminomatous tumor, even if most of the tumor cells belong to seminoma. These subtypes include yolk sac tumor, embryonal cell carcinoma, teratocarcinoma, teratoma, and choriocarcinoma. Clinically nonsemionatous tumors usually present as mixed germ cell tumors with various cell types and in different proportions.

Embryonal cell carcinoma

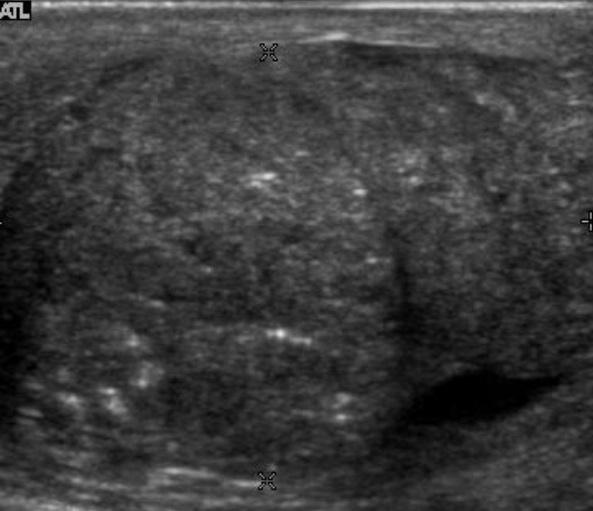
Embryonal cell carcinoma. Longitudinal ultrasound image of the testis shows an irregular heterogeneous mass that forms an irregular margin with the tunica albuginea.

Embryonal cell carcinomas, a more aggressive tumor than seminoma usually occurs in men in their 30s. Although it is the second most common testicular tumor after seminoma, pure embryonal cell carcinoma is rare and constitutes only about 3 percent of the nonseminomatous germ cell tumors. Most of the cases occur in combination with other cell types. At ultrasound, embryonal cell carcinomas are predominantly hypoechoic lesions with ill-defined margins and an inhomogeneous echotexture. Echogenic foci due to hemorrhage, calcification, or fibrosis are commonly seen. Twenty percent of embryonal cell carcinomas have cystic components. The tumor may invade into the tunica albuginea resulting in contour distortion of the testis [Fig. 4].

Yolk sac tumor
Yolk sac tumors also known as endodermal sinus tumors account for 80% of childhood testicular tumors, with most cases occurring before the age of 2 years. Alpha-fetoprotein is normally elevated in greater than 90% of patients with yolk sac tumor (Woodward et al., 2002, as cited in Ulbright et al., 1999). In its pure form, yolk sac tumor is rare in adults; however yolk sac elements are frequently seen in tumors with mixed histologic features in adults and thus indicate poor prognosis. The US appearance of yolk sac tumor is usually nonspecific and consists of inhomogeneous mass that may contain echogenic foci secondary to hemorrhage. Choriocarcinoma --- Choriocarcinoma is a highly malignant testicular tumor that usually develops in the 2nd and 3rd decades of life. Pure choriocarcinomas are rare and represent only less than 1 percent of all testicular tumors. Choriocarcinomas are composed of both cytotrophoblasts and syncytiotrophoblasts, with the latter responsible for the clinical elevation of human chorionic gonadotrophic hormone levels. As microscopic vascular invasion is common in choriocarcinoma, hematogeneous metastasis, especially to the lungs is common. Many choriocarcinomas show extensive hemorrhagic necrosis in the central portion of the tumor; this appears as mixed cystic and solid components at ultrasound.

Teratoma Although teratoma is the second most common testicular tumor in children, it affects all age groups. Mature teratoma in children is often benign, but teratoma in adults, regardless of age, should be considered malignant. Teratomas are composed of all three germ cell layers, i.e. endoderm, mesoderm and ectoderm. At ultrasound, teratomas generally form well-circumscribed complex masses. Echogenic foci representing calcification, cartilage, immature bone and fibrosis are commonly seen [Fig. 5]. Cysts are also a common feature and depending on the contents of the cysts i.e. serous, mucoid or keratinous fluid, it may present as anechoic or complex structure [Fig. 6].

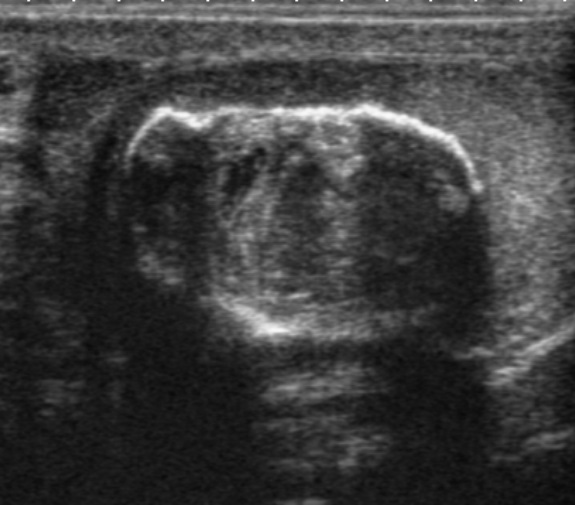
Fig. 5. Teratoma. A plaque-like calcification with acoustic shadow is seen in the testis.

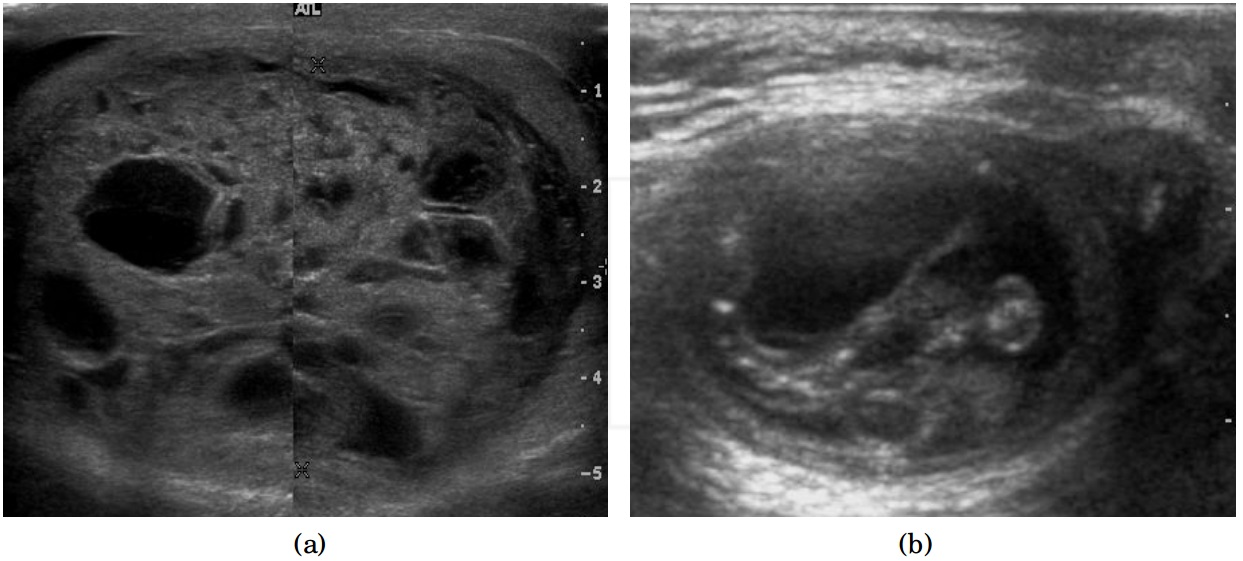
Fig. 6. Mature cystic teratoma. (a) Composite Image. Mature cystic teratoma in a 29-year-old man. Longitudinal sonography image of the right testis shows a multilocular cystic mass. (b) Mature cystic teratoma in a 6-year-old boy. Longitudinal sonography of the right testis shows a cystic mass containing calcification with no obvious acoustic shadow.

=== Non-germ cell tumours ===
==== Sex cord-stromal tumours ====
Sex cord-stromal (gonadal stromal) tumors of the testis, account for 4 per cent of all testicular tumors. The most common are Leydig and Sertoli cell tumors. Although the majority of these tumors are benign, these tumors can produce hormonal changes, for example, Leydig cell tumor in a child may produce isosexual virilization. In adult, it may have no endocrine manifestation or gynecomastia, and decrease in libido may result from production of estrogens. These tumors are typically small and are usually discovered incidentally. They do not have any specific ultrasound appearance but appear as well-defined hypoechoic lesions. These tumors are usually removed because they cannot be distinguished from malignant germ cell tumors.

Leydig cell tumors are the most common type of sex cord–stromal tumor of the testis, accounting for 1%–3% of all testicular tumors. They can be seen in any age group, they are generally small solid masses, but they may show cystic areas, hemorrhage, or necrosis. Their sonographic appearance is variable and is indistinguishable from that of germ cell tumors.

Sertoli cell tumors are less common, constituting less than 1% of testicular tumors. They are less likely than Leydig cell tumors to be hormonally active, but gynecomastia can occur. Sertoli cell tumors are typically well-circumscribed, unilateral, round to lobulated masses.

==== Lymphoma ====
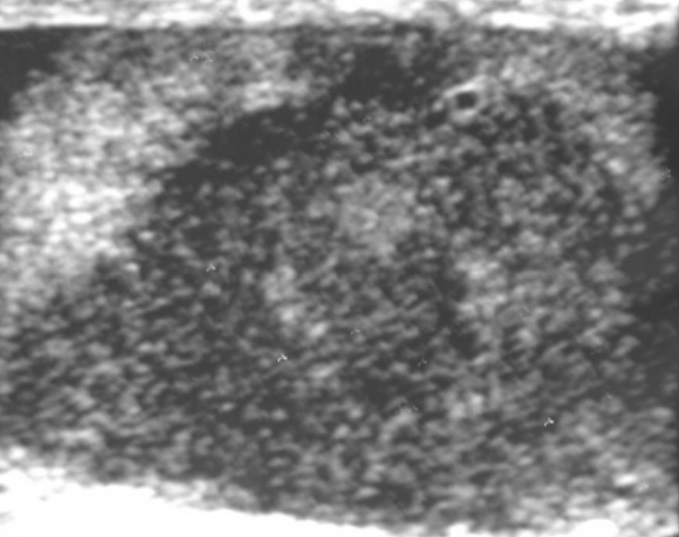
Fig. 7. Lymphoma. Lymphoma in a 61-year-old man. Longitudinal sonography shows an irregular hypoechoic lesion occupied nearly the whole testis.

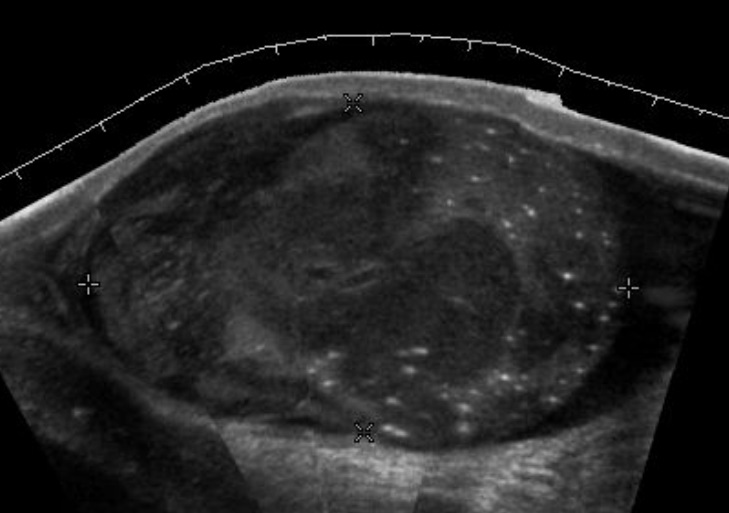
Fig. 8. Primary Lymphoma. Longitudinal sonography of a 64-year-old man shows a lymphoma mimicking a germ cell tumor.

Clinically lymphoma can manifest in one of three ways: as the primary site of involvement, or as a secondary tumor such as the initial manifestation of clinically occult disease or recurrent disease. Although lymphomas constitute 5% of testicular tumors and are almost exclusively diffuse non-Hodgkin B-cell tumors, only less than 1% of non-Hodgkin lymphomas involve the testis.

Patients with testicular lymphoma are usually old aged around 60 years of age, present with painless testicular enlargement and less commonly with other systemic symptoms such as weight loss, anorexia, fever and weakness. Bilateral testicle involvements are common and occur in 8.5% to 18% of cases. At sonography, most lymphomas are homogeneous and diffusely replace the testis [Fig. 7]. However focal hypoechoic lesions can occur, hemorrhage and necrosis are rare. At times, the sonographic appearance of lymphoma is indistinguishable from that of the germ cell tumors [Fig. 8], then the patient's age at presentation, symptoms, and medical history, as well as multiplicity and bilaterality of the lesions, are all important factors in making the appropriate diagnosis.

==== Leukemia ====
Primary leukemia of the testis is rare. However, due to the presence of blood-testis barrier, chemotherapeutic agents are unable to reach the testis, hence in boys with acute lymphoblastic leukemia, testicular involvement is reported in 5% to 10% of patients, with the majority found during clinical remission. The sonographic appearance of leukemia of the testis can be quite varied, as the tumors may be unilateral or bilateral, diffuse or focal, hypoechoic or hyperechoic. These findings are usually indistinguishable from that of the lymphoma [Fig. 9].

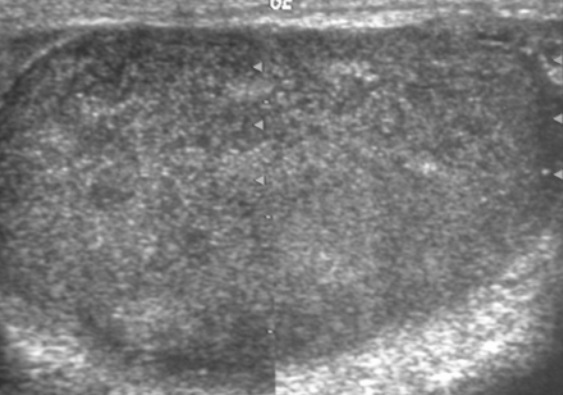
Fig. 9. Leukemia. Diffuse hypoechoic infiltrative lesions are seen involving the whole testis, indistinguishable from that of the lymphoma.

=== Epidermoid cyst ===
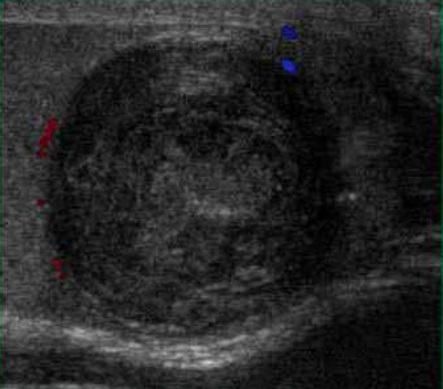
Fig. 10. Epidermoid cyst. Onion peel appearances of the tumor together with absence of vascular flow are typical findings of epidermoid cyst.

Epidermoid cysts, also known as keratocysts, are benign epithelial tumors which usually occur in the second to fourth decades and accounts for only 1–2% of all intratesticular tumors. As these tumors have a benign biological behavior and with no malignant potential, preoperative recognition of this tumor is important as this will lead to testicle preserving surgery (enucleation) rather than unnecessary orchiectomy. Clinically, epidermoid cyst cannot be differentiated from other testicular tumors, typically presenting as a non-tender, palpable, solitary intratesticular mass. Tumor markers such as serum beta-human chorionic gonadotropin and alpha-feto protein are negative. The ultrasound patterns of epidermoid cysts are variable and include:

1. A mass with a target appearance, i.e. a central hypoechoic area surrounded by an

echolucent rim;

1. An echogenic mass with dense acoustic shadowing due to calcification;
2. A well-circumscribed mass with a hyperechoic rim;
3. Mixed pattern having heterogeneous echotexture and poor-defined contour and
4. An onion peel appearance consisting of alternating rings of hyperechogenicities and

hypoechogenicities.

However, these patterns, except the latter one, may be considered as non-specific as heterogeneous echotexture and shadowing calcification can also be detected in malignant testicular tumors. The onion peel pattern of epidermoid cyst [Fig. 10] correlates well with the pathologic finding of multiple layers of keratin debris produced by the lining of the epidermoid cyst. This sonographic appearance should be considered characteristic of an epidermoid cyst and corresponds to the natural evolution of the cyst. Absence of vascular flow is another important feature that is helpful in differentiation of epidermoid cyst from other solid intratesticular lesions.

== Extratesticular tumors ==
Although most of the extratesticular lesions are benign, malignancy does occur; the most common malignant tumors in infants and children are rhabdomyosarcomas. Other malignant tumors include liposarcoma, leiomyosarcoma, malignant fibrous histiocytoma and mesothelioma.

=== Rhabdomyosarcoma ===
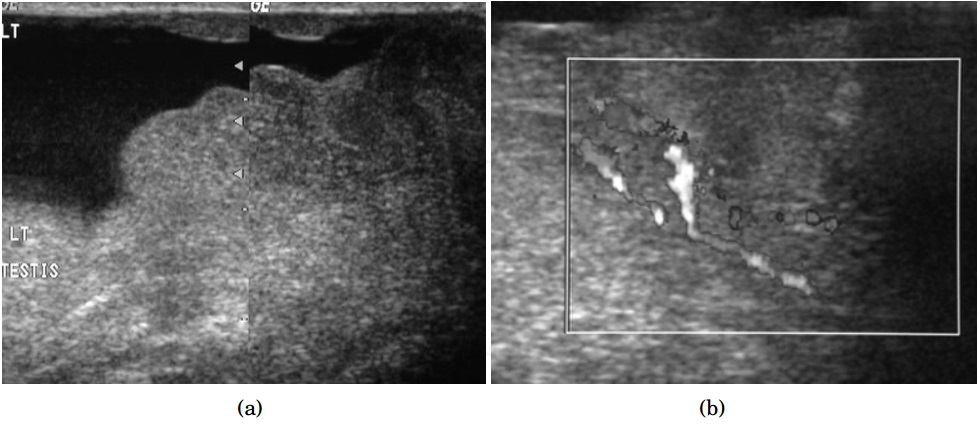
Rhabdomyosarcoma (a) Longitudinal section (composite image) of high resolution ultrasound of a 14-year-old boy shows a well defined hypoechoic extratesticular mass is found in the left scrotum, hydrocele is also present. (b) Color Doppler ultrasound shows that the mass is hypervascular.

Rhabdomyosarcoma is the most common tumor of the lower genitourinary tract in children in the first two decades, it may develop anywhere in the body, and 4% occur in the paratesticular region which carries a better outcome than lesions elsewhere in the genitourinary tract. Clinically, the patient usually presents with non-specific complaints of a unilateral, painless intrascrotal swelling not associated with fever.

Transillumination test is positive when a hydrocele is present, often resulting in a misdiagnosis of epididymitis, which is more commonly associated with hydrocele. The ultrasound findings of paratesticular rhabdomyosarcoma are variable. It usually presents as an echo-poor mass [Fig. 11a] with or without hydrocele. With color Doppler sonography these tumors are generally hypervascular.

=== Mesothelioma ===
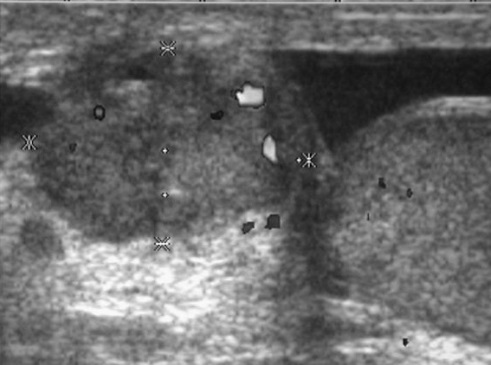
Mesothelioma arising from the tunica vaginalis. Color Doppler ultrasound demonstrates a well-defined hypoechoic nodule occupying the left epididymal head, with a few areas of color flow demonstrated. The left testis is intact with no focal nodule detected. Hydrocele is also present.

Malignant mesothelioma is an uncommon tumor arising in body cavities lined by mesothelium. The majority of these tumors are found in the pleura, peritoneum and less frequently pericardium. As the tunica vaginalis is a layer of reflected peritoneum, mesothelioma can occur in the scrotal sac. Although trauma, herniorrhaphy and long term hydrocele have been considered as the predisposing factors for development of malignant mesothelioma, the only well established risk factor is asbestos exposure. Patients with malignant mesothelioma of the tunica vaginalis frequently have a progressively enlarging hydrocele and less frequently a scrotal mass, rapid re-accumulation of fluid after aspiration raises the suggestion of malignancy.

The reported ultrasound features of mesothelioma of the tunica vaginalis testis are variable. Hydrocele, either simple or complex is present and may be associated with:

1. multiple extratesticular papillary projections of mixed echogenicity;
2. multiple extratesticular nodular masses of increased echogenicity;
3. focal irregular thickening of the tunica vaginalis testis;
4. a simple hydrocele as the only finding and
5. A single hypoechoic mass located in the epididymal head. With color Doppler sonography, mesothelioma is hypovascular [Fig. 12].

=== Leiomyoma ===
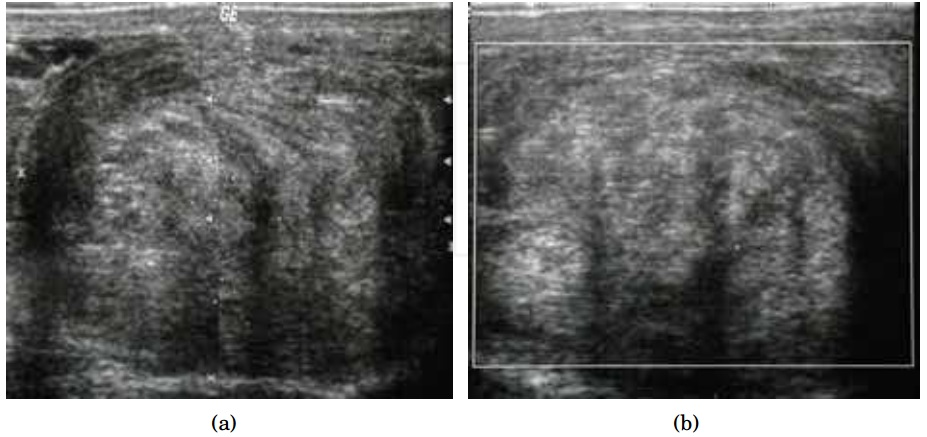
Leiomyoma arising from tunica albuginea. (a) Montage of 2 contiguous sonograms of a 67-year-old man shows a well-defined extratesticular mass with a whorl-shaped echotexture. (b) Color Doppler sonogram shows no internal vascularity. Note the presence of multiple shadows not associated with echogenic foci in the mass.

Leiomyomas are benign neoplasms that may arise from any structure or organ containing smooth muscle. The majority of genitourinary leiomyomas are found in the renal capsule, but this tumor has also been reported in the epididymis, spermatic cord, and tunica albuginea. Scrotal leiomyomas have been reported in patients from the fourth to ninth decades of life with most presenting during the fifth decade. These tumors are generally slow growth and asymptomatic. The sonographic features of leiomyomas have been reported as solid hypoechoic or heterogeneous masses that may or may not contain shadowing calcification. Other findings include whorl shaped configuration [Fig. 13a] of the nodule and multiple, narrow areas of shadowing not cast by calcifications [Fig. 13b], but corresponding to transition zones between the various tissue components of the mass are characteristic of leiomyoma and may help differentiate it from other scrotal tumors.

=== Fat containing tumors ===
==== Lipoma ====
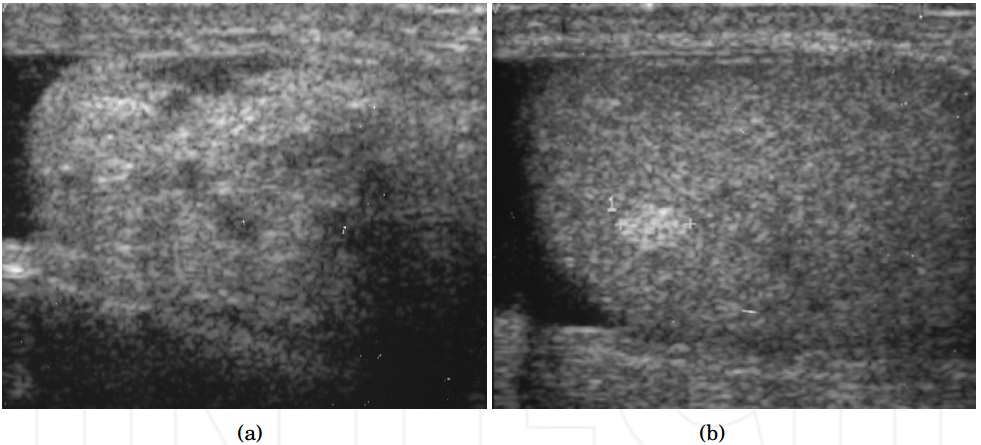
Lipoma at spermatic cord and testiscle. (a) Longitudinal scrotal sonography of a 61-year-old patient shows a well defined hyperechoic nodule is seen in the scrotum. (b) Scrotal sonography of the same patient shows a hyper echoic nodule in the left testis, pathology proved that this is a lipoma too.

Lipoma is the most common nontesticular intrascrotal tumor. It can be divided into three types depending upon the site of origination and spread:

1. Originating in the spermatic cord with spread to the scrotum;
2. Originating and developing within the cord (most common type) and
3. Originating and developing within the scrotum.

At ultrasound, lipoma is a well–defined, homogeneous, hyperechoic paratesticular lesion of varying size [Fig. 14]. The simple finding of an echogenic fatty mass within the inguinal canal, while suggestive of a lipoma, should also raise a question of fat from the omentum secondary to an inguinal hernia. However lipomas are well-defined masses, whereas herniated omentum appears to be more elongated and can be traced to the inguinal area, hence scanning along the inguinal canal as well as the scrotum is necessary to make the differential diagnosis. Magnetic resonance imaging and computerized tomography are helpful in doubtful cases.

==== Liposarcoma ====
Malignant extratesticular tumors are rare. Most of the malignant tumors are solid and have nonspecific features on ultrasonography. The majority of the malignant extratesticular tumors arise from spermatic cord with liposarcoma being the most common in adults. On gross specimen, liposarcoma is a solid, bulky lipomatous tumor with heterogeneous architecture, often containing areas of calcification. Although the sonographic appearances of liposarcoma are variable and nonspecific, it still provides a clue about the presence of lipomatous matrix. Echogenic areas corresponding to fat often associated with poor sound transmission and areas of heterogeneous echogenicity corresponding to nonlipomatous component are present. Some liposarcomas may also mimic the sonographic appearance of lipomas [Fig. 16] and hernias that contain omentum, but lipomas are generally smaller and more homogeneous and hernias are elongated masses that can often be traced back to the inguinal canal. CT and MR imaging are more specific, as they can easily recognize fatty component along with other soft tissue component more clearly than ultrasound.

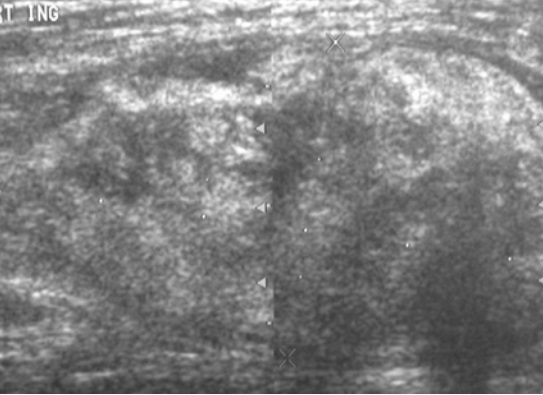
Liposarcoma. A heterogeneous mass consists of an upper hyperechoic portion corresponds to lipomatous matrix and areas of hypoechogenicity corresponds to nonlipomatous component is seen.

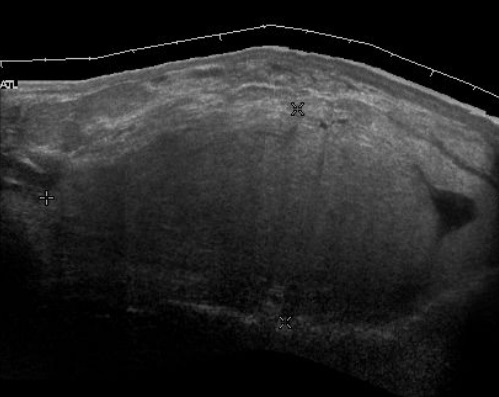
Fig. 16. Liposarcoma mimicking lipoma. A homogeneous hypoechoic mass presents with the same appearance of lipoma, rapid growth of this tumors grants surgical intervention with pathology proved to be well differentiated liposarcoma.

=== Adenomatoid tumor ===
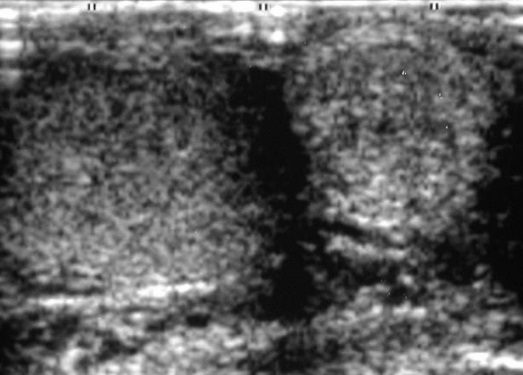
Adenomatoid tumor at epididymis. A nodule that is isoechoic to the testis is seen occupying nearly the entire epididymal tail.

Adenomatoid tumors are the most common tumors of the epididymis and account for approximately 30% of all paratesticular neoplasms, second only to lipoma. They are usually unilateral, more common on the left side, and usually involve the epididymal tail. Adenomatoid tumor typically occurs in men during the third and fourth decades of life. Patients usually present with a painless scrotal mass that is smooth, round and well circumscribed on palpation. They are believed to be of mesothelial origin and are universally benign. Their sonographic appearance is that of a round-shaped, well-defined, homogeneous mass with echogenicity ranging from hypo- to iso- to hyperechoic.

=== Fibrous pseudotumor ===
Fibrous pseudotumors, also known as fibromas are thought to be reactive, nonneoplastic lesions. They can occur at any age, about 50% of fibromas are associated with hydrocele, and 30% are associated with a history of trauma or inflammation (Akbar et al., 2003). Although the exact cause of this tumor is not completely understood, it is generally believed that these lesions represent a benign reactive proliferation of inflammatory and fibrous tissue, in response to chronic irritation. Sonographic evaluation generally shows one or more solid nodules arising from the tunica vaginalis, epididymis, spermatic cord and tunica albuginea [Fig. 18]. A hydrocele is frequently present too. The nodules may appear hypoechoic or hyperechoic, depending on the amount of collagen or fibroblast present. Acoustic shadowing may occur in the absence of calcification due to the dense collagen component of this tumor. With color Doppler sonography, a small to moderate amount of vascularity may be seen [Fig. 19].

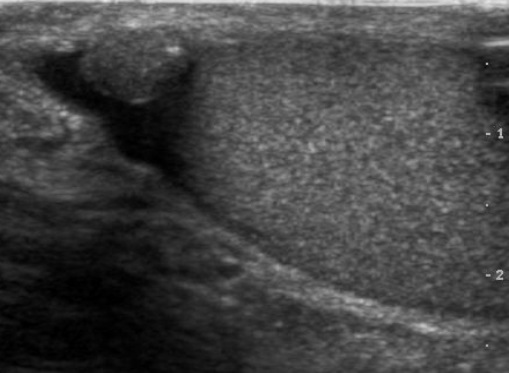
Fig. 18. Fibrous pseudotumor. A homogeneous hypoechoic nodular lesion is seen attached to the tunica associated with minimal amount of hydrocele.

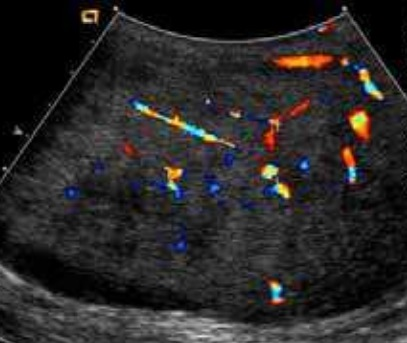
Fig. 19. Fibrous pseudotumor. With color Doppler, a little vascular flow is seen in this fibrous pseudotumor.

== Inflammation ==
=== Epididymitis and epididymo-orchitis ===
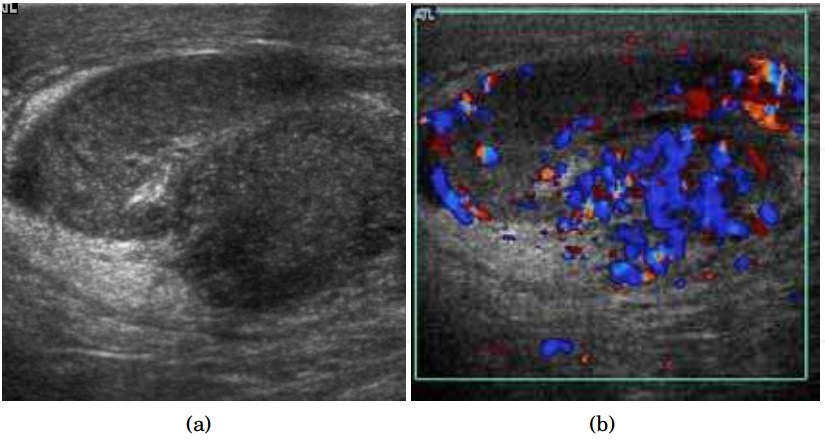
Epididymo-orchitis in a 77-year-old man. (a) Transverse sonography shows enlargement of the epididymis with hypoechogenicity noted over the testis and epididymis associated with scrotal wall thickening. (b) Color Doppler sonography showed hyperemic change of the testis and epididymis, presenting as an “inferno” vascular flow pattern.

Epididymitis and epididymo-orchitis are common causes of acute scrotal pain in adolescent boys and adults. At physical examination, they usually are palpable as tender and enlarged structures. Clinically, this disease can be differentiated from torsion of the spermatic cord by elevation of the testes above the pubic symphysis. If scrotal pain decreases, it is more likely to be due to epididymitis rather than torsion (Prehn's sign). Most cases of epididymitis are secondary to sexually transmitted disease or retrograde bacteria infection from the urinary bladder. The infection usually begins in the epididymal tail and spreads to the epididymal body and head. Approximately 20% to 40% of cases are associated with orchitis due to direct spread of infection into the testis.

At ultrasound, the findings of acute epididymitis include an enlarged hypoechoic or hyperechoic (presumably secondary to hemorrhage) epididymis [Fig. 20a]. Other signs of inflammation such as increased vascularity, reactive hydrocele, pyocele and scrotal wall thickening may also be present. Testicular involvement is confirmed by the presence of testicular enlargement and an inhomogeneous echotexture. Hypervascularity on color Doppler images [Fig. 20b] is a well-established diagnostic criterion and may be the only imaging finding of epididymo-orchitis in some men.

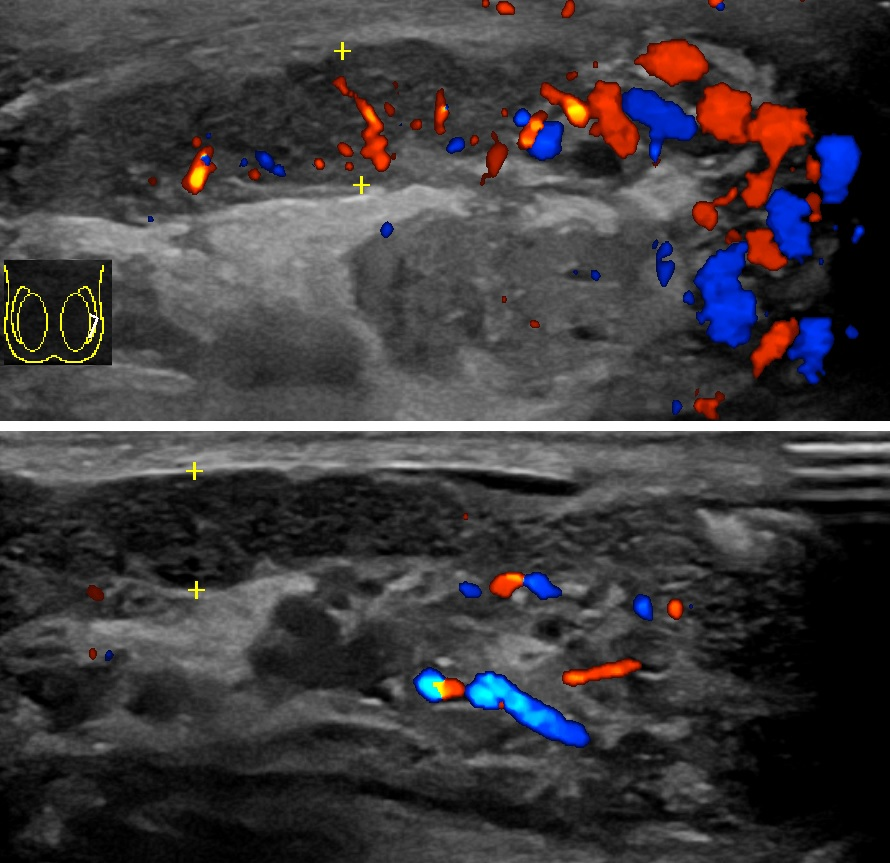
Doppler ultrasound of epididymitis, seen as a substantial increase in blood flow in the left epididymis (top image), while it is normal in the right (bottom image). The thickness of the epididymis (between yellow crosses) is only slightly increased (7 mm).

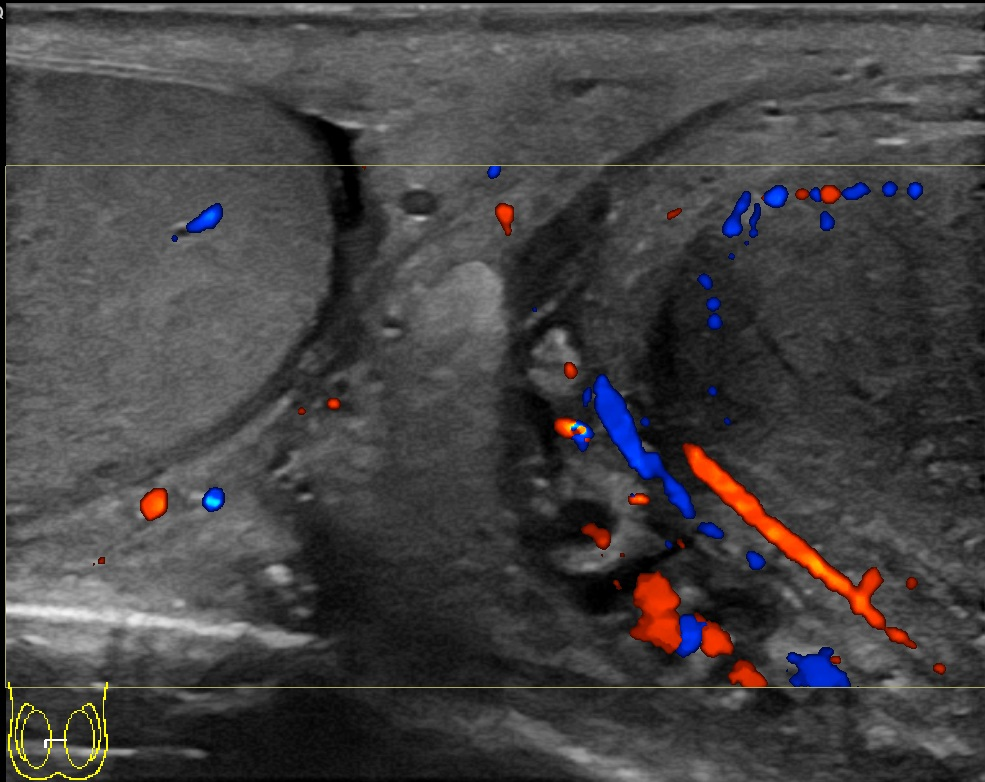
Doppler ultrasound of the scrotum of the same case, in the axial plane, showing orchitis (as part of epididymo-orchitis) as hypoechogenic and slightly heterogenic left testicular tissue (right in image), with an increased blood flow. There is also swelling of peritesticular tissue.

=== Tuberculous epididymo-orchitis ===
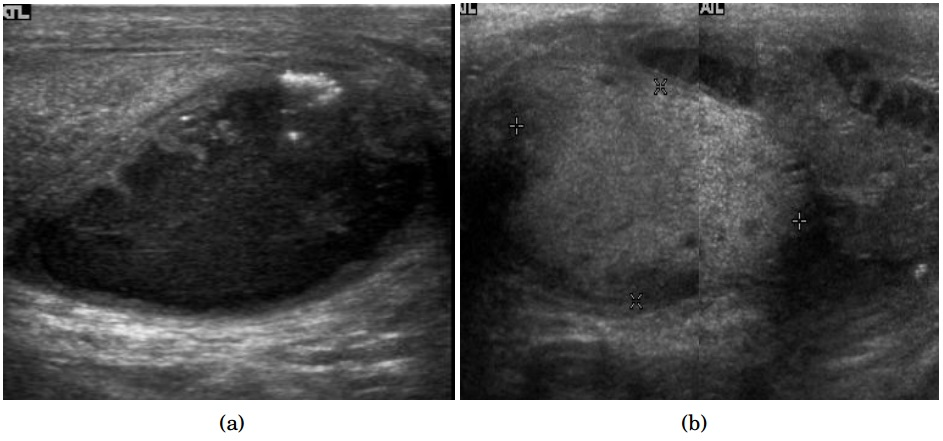
Fig. 21. Tuberculous epididymo-orchitis. (a) Transverse sonography of a surgically proved tuberculous epididymitis shows an enlarged epididymis containing calcification and necrosis. (b) Composite image: Transverse sonography of the same patient shows multiple hypoechoic nodules in the left testis associated with surrounding reactive hydrocele.

Although the genitourinary tract is the most common site of extra-pulmonary involvement by tuberculosis, tuberculous infection of the scrotum is rare and occurs in approximately 7% of patients with tuberculosis. At the initial stage of infection, the epididymis alone is involved. However, if appropriate antituberculous treatment is not administered promptly, the infection will spread to the ipsilateral testis. The occurrence of isolated testicular tuberculosis is rare. Clinically patients with tuberculous epididymo-orchitis may present with painful or painless enlargement of the scrotum, hence they cannot be distinguished from lesions such as testicular tumor, testicular infarction and may mimic testicular torsion.

At ultrasound, tuberculous epididymitis is characterized by an enlarged epididymis with variable echogenicity. The presence of calcification, caseation necrosis, granulomas and fibrosis can result in heterogeneous echogenicity [Fig. 21a]. The ultrasound findings of tuberculous orchitis are as follow: (a) diffusely enlarged heterogeneously hypoechoic testis (b) diffusely enlarged homogeneously hypoechoic testis (c) nodular enlarged heterogeneously hypoechoic testis and (d) presence of multiple small hypoechoic nodules in an enlarged testis [Fig. 21b].

Although both bacterial and tuberculous infections may involve both the epididymis and the testes, an enlarged epididymis with heterogeneously hypoechoic pattern favors a diagnosis of tuberculosis (Muttarak and Peh, 2006, as cited in Kim et al., 1993 and Chung et al., 1997). With color Doppler ultrasound, a diffuse increased blood flow pattern is seen in bacterial epididymitis, whereas focal linear or spotty blood flow signals are seen in the peripheral zone of the affected epididymis in patients with tuberculosis.

=== Fournier gangrene ===
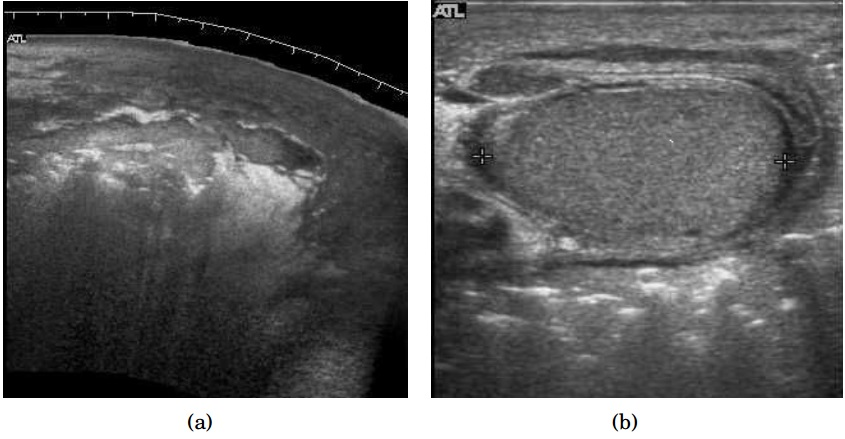
Fournier gangrene. (a) Transverse sonography image shows echogenic areas with dirty shadowing representing air in the perineum. (b) Gas presented as numerous, discrete, hyperechoic foci with reverberation artifacts is seen at scrotal wall.

Fournier gangrene is a polymicrobial necrotizing fasciitis involving the perineal, perianal, or genital regions and constitutes a true surgical emergency with a potentially high mortality rate. Majorly caused by Haemolytic streptococci organisms (Staphylococcus, E.coli, Clostrdium welchii). It usually develops from a perineal or genitourinary infection but can arise following local trauma with secondary infection of the wound. 40–60% of patients are being diabetic. Although the diagnosis of Fournier gangrene is often made clinically, diagnostic imaging is useful in ambiguous cases. The sonographic hallmark of Fournier gangrene is presence of subcutaneous gas within the thickened scrotal wall. At ultrasound, the gas appears as numerous, discrete, hyperechoic foci with reverberation artifacts [Fig. 22]. Evidence of gas within the scrotal wall may be seen prior to clinical crepitus. The only other condition manifesting with gas at sonographic examination is an inguinoscrotal hernia. This can be differentiated from Fournier gangrene by the presence of gas within the protruding bowel lumen and away from the scrotal wall. (Levenson et al., 2008).

== Other benign lesions of the scrotum ==
=== Tubular ectasia ===
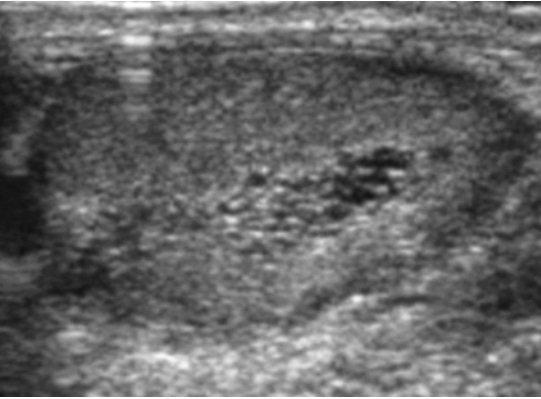
Fig. 23. Tubular ectasia of the testis. Honey-comb shaped cystic lesion at mediastinum testis.

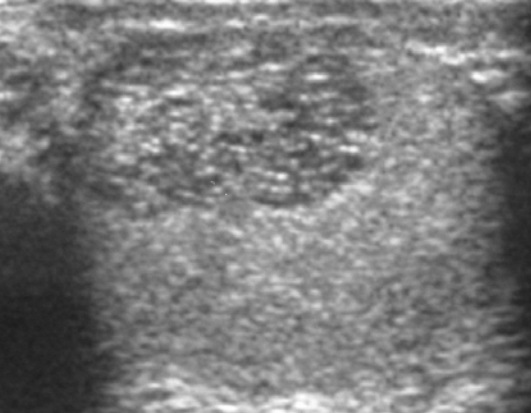
Fig. 24. Tubular ectasia of the testis. Lesion in the testis mimicking testicular tumor, but the microcystic appearance of this lesion is suggestive of tubular ectasia.

The normal testis consists of several hundred lobules, with each lobule containing several seminiferous tubules. The seminiferous tubules of each lobule merge to form the straight tubes, which in turn converge to form the rete testis. The rete testis tubules, which lie within the mediastinum testis, are an anastomosing network of irregular channels with a broad lumen, which then empties into the efferent ductules to give rise to the head of the epididymis. Obstruction in the epididymis or efferent ductules may lead to cystic dilatation of the efferent ductules, which usually presents as an epididymal cyst on ultrasound. However, in the more proximal portion this could lead to the formation of an intratesticular cyst or dilatation of the tubules, so-called tubular ectasia. Factors contributing to the development of tubular ectasia include epididymitis, testicular biopsy, vasectomy or an aging process. Clinically this lesion is usually asymptomatic. The ultrasound appearance of a microcystic or multiple tubular-like lesions located at the mediastinal testis [Fig. 23] and associated with an epididymal cyst in a middle-aged or elderly patient should alert the sonographer to the possibility of tubular ectasia. The differential diagnosis of a multicystic lesion in testis should include a cystic tumor, especially a cystic teratoma. A cystic teratoma is usually a palpable lesion containing both solid and cystic components; and the cysts are normally larger than that of tubular ectasia, which appear microcystic [Fig. 24]. Furthermore, the location of tubular ectasia in the mediastinum testis is also helpful in making the differential diagnosis.

=== Testicular microlithiasis ===
Histologically, testicular microlithiasis refers to the scattered laminated calcium deposits in the lumina of the seminiferous tubules. These calcifications arise from degeneration of the cells lining the seminiferous tubules. At ultrasonography, microliths appear as tiny punctate echogenic foci, which typically do not shadow. Although minor microcalcification within a testis is considered normal, the typical US appearance of testicular microlithiasis is of multiple nonshadowing echogenic foci measuring 2–3 mm and randomly scattered throughout the testicular parenchyma [Fig. 25] (Dogra et al., 2003, as cited in Janzen et al., 1992). The clinical significance of testicular microlithiasis is that it is associated with increased risk of testicular malignancy, thus follow up of affected individuals with scrotal sonography is necessary to ensure that a testicular tumor does not develop.

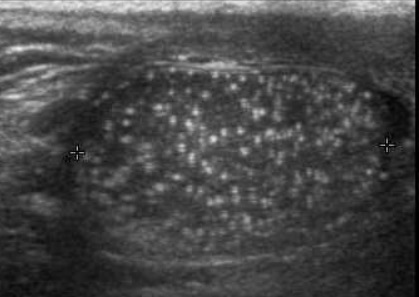
Fig. 25. Testicular microlithiasis. Multiple hyperechoic foci without acoustic shadow presenting as a starry sky appearance is seen in the testis.

=== Testicular torsion ===
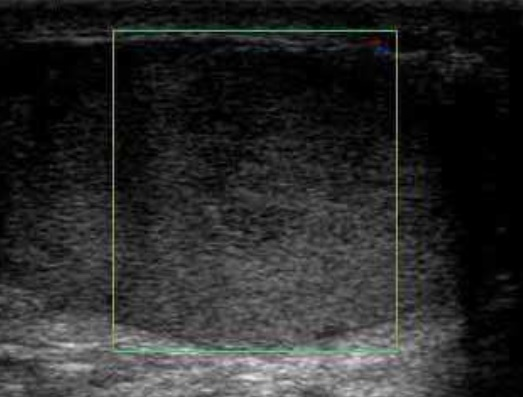
Fig. 26. Testicular torsion of the right testis. Absence of vascular flow and ill-defined hypoechoic lesions are seen in the testis.

The normal testis and epididymis are anchored to the scrotal wall. If there is a lack of development of these attachments, the testis is free to twist on its vascular pedicle. This will result in torsion of the spermatic cord and interruption of testicular blood flow. Testicular torsion occurs most commonly at 12 to 18 years but can occur at any age. Torsion results in swelling and edema of the testis, and as the edema increases, testicular perfusion is further altered. The extent of testicular ischemia depends on the degree of torsion, which ranges from 180° to 720° or greater. The testicular salvage rate depends on the degree of torsion and the duration of ischemia. A nearly 100% salvage rate exists within the first 6 hours after the onset of symptoms; a 70% rate, within 6–12 hours; and a 20% rate, within 12–24 hours. Therefore, testicular torsion is a surgical emergency and the role of ultrasound is to differentiate it from epididymitis as both disease presents with acute testicular pain clinically.

There are two types of testicular torsion: extravaginal and intravaginal. Extravaginal torsion occurs exclusively in newborns. Ultrasound findings include an enlarged heterogeneous testis, ipsilateral hydrocele, thickened scrotal wall and absence of vascular flow in the testis and spermatic cord. The ultrasound findings of intravaginal torsion vary with the duration and the degree of rotation of the spermatic cord. Gray scale ultrasound may appear normal if the torsion just occurs. At 4–6 hours after onset of torsion, enlarged testis with decreased echogenicity is seen. At 24 hours after onset, the testis appears heterogeneous due to vascular congestion, hemorrhage and infarction. As gray scale ultrasound is often normal during early onset of torsion, Doppler sonography is considered essential in early diagnosis of testicular torsion. The absence of testicular flow at color and power Doppler ultrasound is considered diagnostic of ischemia, provided that the scanner is set for detection of slow flow, the sampling box is small and the scanner is adjusted for the lowest repetition frequency and the lowest possible threshold setting.

=== Varicocele ===
Fig. 27. Varicocele. (a) Multiple tortuous tubular like structure are seen in the left scrotum. (b) Color Doppler sonography shows vascular reflux during Valsalva's maneuver.

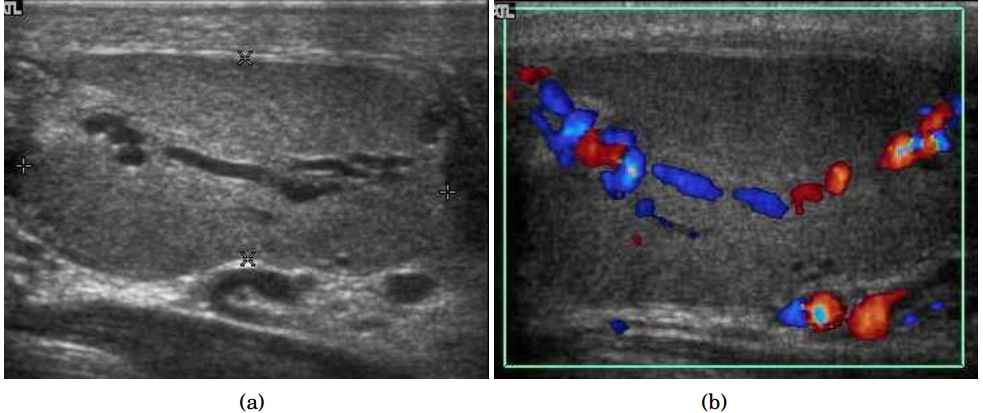
Fig. 28. Intratesticular varicocele. (a) Dilated tubular structures are seen within the testis. (b) Presence of vascular reflux is noted during Valsalva's maneuver.

Varicocele refers to abnormal dilatation of the veins of the spermatic cord due to incompetence of valve in the spermatic vein. This results in impaired blood drainage into the spermatic vein when the patient assumes a standing position or during Valsalva's maneuver. Varicoceles are more common on the left side due to the following reasons (a) The left testicular vein is longer; (b) the left testicular vein enters the left renal vein at a right angle; (c) the left testicular artery in some men arches over the left renal vein, thereby compressing it; and (d) the descending colon distended with feces may compress the left testicular vein.

The US appearance of varicocele consists of multiple, hypoechoic, serpiginous, tubular like structures of varying sizes larger than 2 mm in diameter that is usually best visualized superior or lateral to the testis [Fig. 27a]. Color flow and duplex Doppler US optimized for low-flow velocities help confirm the venous flow pattern, with phasic variation and retrograde filling during a Valsalva's maneuver [Fig. 27b]. Intratesticular varicocele may appear as a vague hypoechoic area in the testis or mimics tubular ectasia. With color Doppler, this intratesticular hypoechoic area also showed reflux of vascular flow during Valsalva's maneuver [Fig. 28].

=== Undescended testis ===
Normally the testes begin its descent through the inguinal canal to the scrotum at 36 weeks’ of gestation and completed at birth. Failure in the course of testes descent will result in undescended testes (Cryptorchidism).

Undescended testis is found in 4% of full-term infants but only 0.8% of males at the age of 1 year have true cryptorchidism. Although an undescended testis can be found anywhere along the pathway of descent from the retroperitoneum to the scrotum, the inguinal canal is the most common site for an undescended testis. Deviation of testis from the normal pathway of descent will result in ectopic testis that is commonly seen in pubopenile, femoral triangle and perineal regions.

Besides infertility, undescended testes carry an increased risk of malignancy even for the normally located contralateral testis. The risk of malignancy is estimated to be as high as 10 times the normal individual with seminoma being the most common malignancy.

The incidence of infertility is decreased if surgical orchiopexy is carried out before the 1–3 years but the risk of malignancy does not change. Because of the superficial location of the inguinal canal in children, sonography of undescended testes should be performed with a high frequency transducer. At ultrasound, the undescended testis usually appears small, less echogenic than the contralateral normal testis and usually located in the inguinal region [Fig. 29]. With color Doppler, the vascularity of the undescended testis is poor.

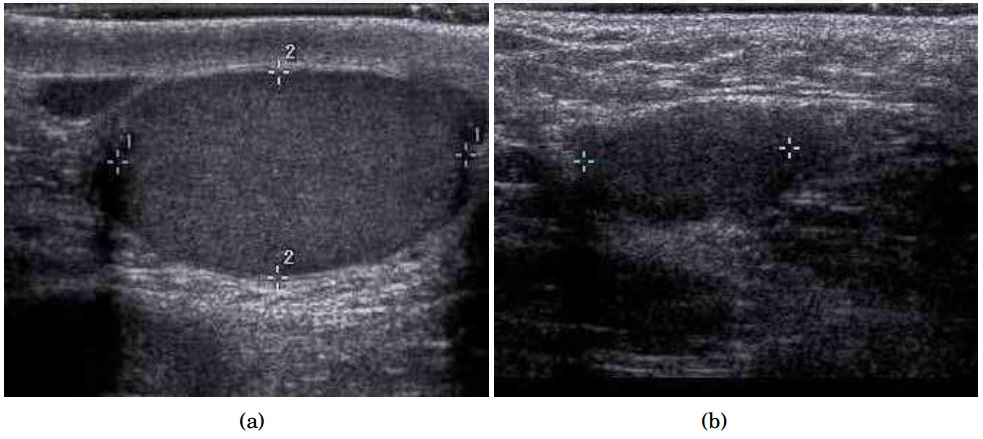
Fig. 29. Undescended testis. (a) Normal testis in the scrotum. (b) Atrophic and decreased echogenicity of the contralateral testis of the same patient seen in the inguinal region.

=== Testicular appendiceal torsion ===
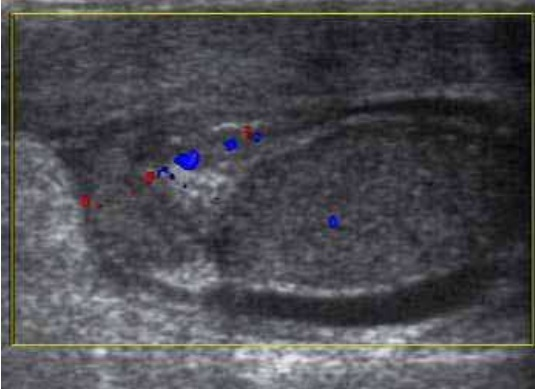
Fig. 30. Testicular appendiceal torsion. A hyperechoic lesion with surrounding vascularity is seen in the groove between the testis and epididymis.

At sonography, the appendix testis usually appears as a 5 mm ovoid structure located in the groove between the testis and the epididymis. Normally it is isoechoic to the testis but at times it may be cystic. The appendix epididymis is of the same size as the appendix testis but is more often pedunculated. Clinically pain may occur with torsion of either appendage. Physical examination showed a small, firm nodule is palpable on the superior aspect of the testis and a bluish discoloration known as ‘‘blue dot’’ sign may be seen on the overlying skin. Torsion of the appendiceal testis most frequently involved in boys aged 7–14 years (Dogra and Bhatt 2004). The sonographic features of testicular appendiceal torsion include a circular mass with variable echogenicity located adjacent to the testis or epididymis [Fig. 30], reactive hydrocele and skin thickening of the scrotum is common, increased peripheral vascular flow may be found around the testicular appendage on color Doppler ultrasound. Surgical intervention is unnecessary and pain usually resolves in 2 to 3 days with an atrophied or calcified appendages remaining.

=== Hematocele ===
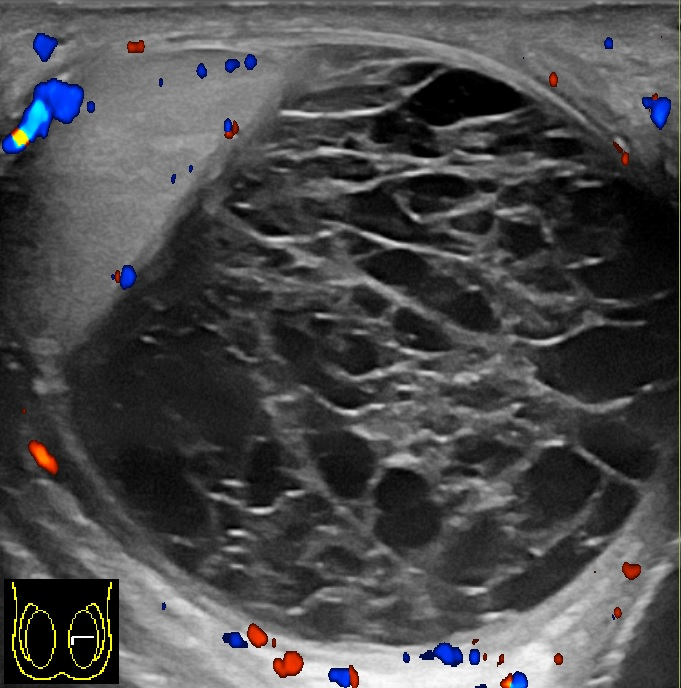
Scrotal ultrasonography of a hematocele, a couple of weeks after presentation, as a fluid volume with multiple thick septations. The hematocele displays no blood flow on Doppler ultrasonography. A pyocele has a similar appearance, but was excluded by lack of inflammation.

A scrotal hematocele is a collection of blood in the tunica vaginalis around the testicle. It can follow trauma (such as a straddle injury) or can be a complication of surgery. It is often accompanied by testicular pain. It has been reported in patients with hemophilia and following catheterization of the femoral artery. If the diagnosis is not clinically evident, transillumination (with a penlight against the scrotum) will show a non-translucent fluid inside the scrotum. Ultrasound imaging may also be useful in confirming the diagnosis. In severe or non-resolving cases, surgical incision and drainage may be required. To prevent recurrence following surgical drainage, a drain may be left at the surgical site.

=== Fibrotic striations ===
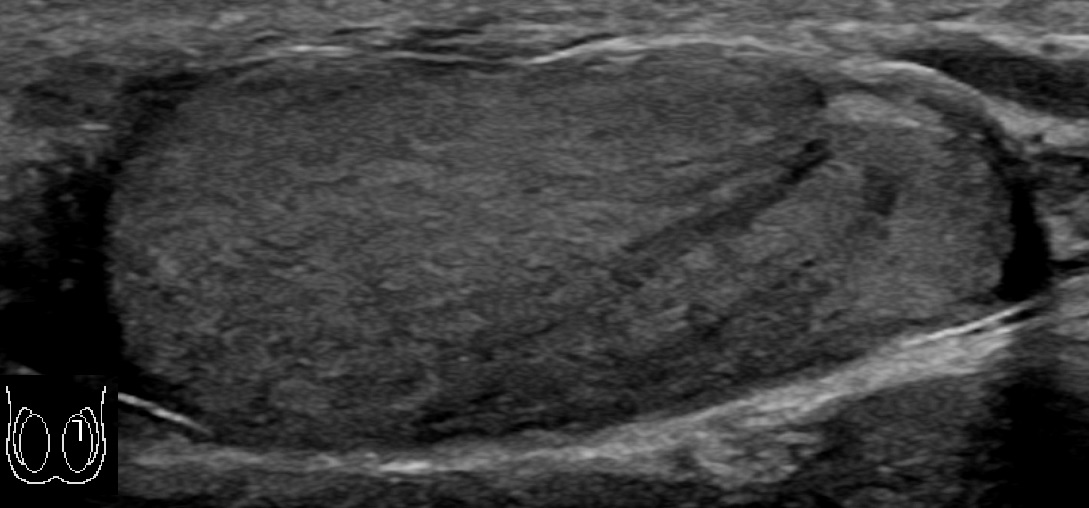
Fibrotic striations.

A striated pattern of the testicle, radiating from its mediastinum, does not have clinical importance unless there are alarming symptoms or abnormal signal on Doppler ultrasonography. It is presumed to represent fibrosis.

== Conclusion ==
Ultrasound remains as the mainstay in scrotal imaging not only because of its high accuracy, excellent depiction of scrotal anatomy, low cost and wide availability, it is also useful in determining whether a mass is intra- or extra-testicular, thus providing us useful and valuable information to decide whether a mass is benign or malignant even though malignancy does occur in extratesticular tumors and vice versa. Furthermore, ultrasound also provides information essential to reach a specific diagnosis in patients with testicular torsion, testicular appendiceal torsion and inflammation such as epididymo-orchitis, Fournier gangrene etc., thus enabling us to avoid unnecessary operation.

== See also ==
- Male infertility § Ultrasonography
