= Hydrocele =

Accumulation of fluid in a body cavity

- Other names: hydrocoele
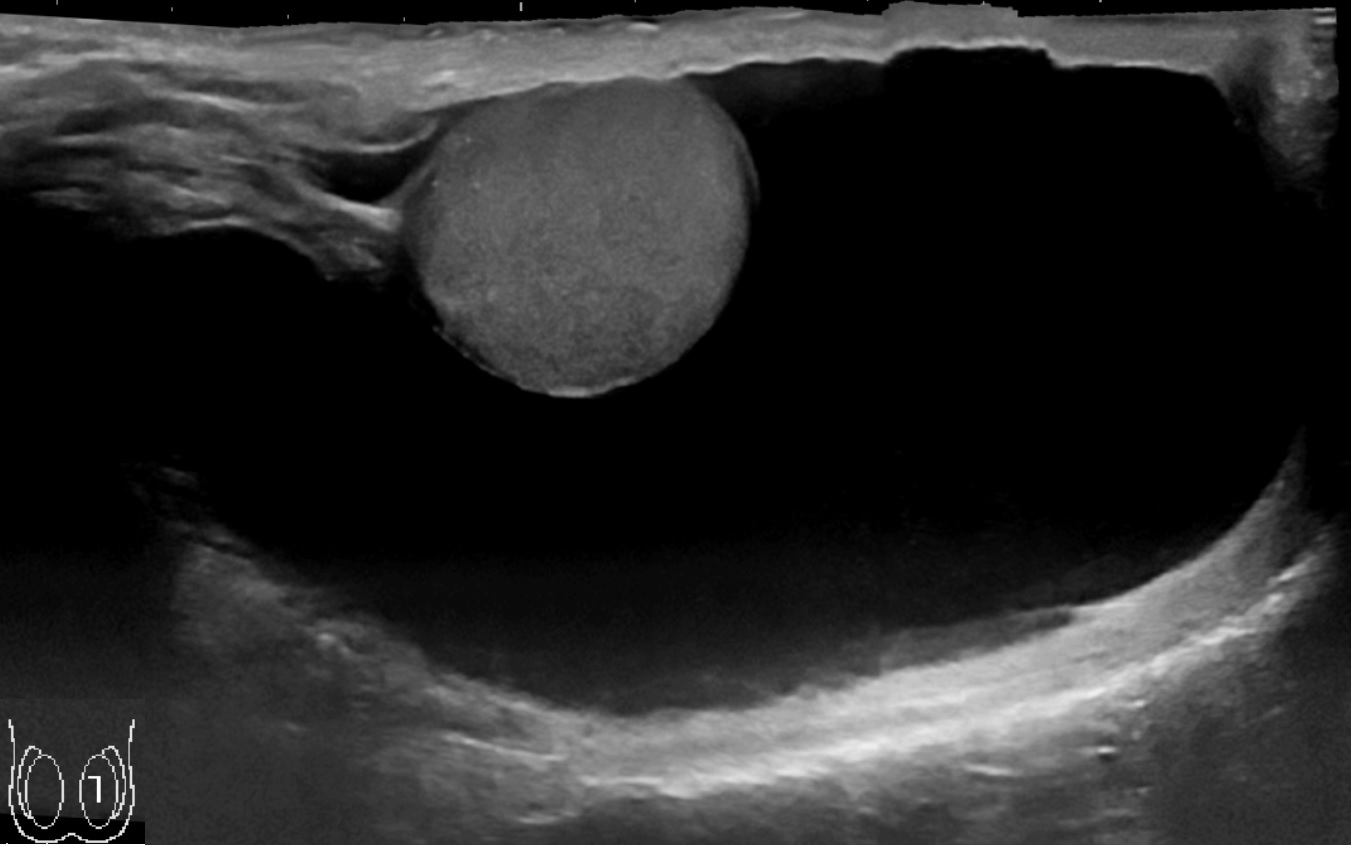
- Scrotal ultrasound of a 10 cm large hydrocele, with anechoic (dark) fluid surrounding the testicle
- Specialty: Urology

A hydrocele is an accumulation of serous fluid in a body cavity. A hydrocele testis, the most common form of hydrocele, is the accumulation of fluids around a testicle. It is often caused by fluid collecting within a layer wrapped around the testicle, called the tunica vaginalis, which is derived from peritoneum. Provided there is no hernia present, it goes away without treatment in the first year. Although hydroceles usually develop in males, rare instances have been described in females in the canal of Nuck.

Primary hydroceles may develop in adulthood, particularly in the elderly and in hot countries, by slow accumulation of serous fluid. This is presumably caused by impaired reabsorption, which appears to be the explanation for most primary hydroceles, although the reason remains obscure. A hydrocele can also be the result of a plugged inguinal lymphatic system caused by repeated, chronic infection of Wuchereria bancrofti or Brugia malayi, two mosquito-borne parasites of Africa and Southeast Asia, respectively. As such, the condition would be a part of more diffuse sequelae commonly referred to as elephantiasis, which also affects the lymphatic system in other parts of the body.

== Presentation ==
=== Complications ===
Among the complications of hydrocele are:

- Rupture usually occurs as a result of trauma but may be spontaneous. On rare occasions cure results after the fluid has been absorbed.
- Transformation into a haematocele occurs if there is spontaneous bleeding into the sac or as a result of trauma. Acute haemorrhage into the tunica vaginalis sometimes results from testicular trauma and it may be difficult without exploration to decide whether the testis has been ruptured. If the haematocele is not drained, a clotted haematocele usually results.
- The sac may calcify. Clotted hydrocele may result from a slow spontaneous ooze of blood into the tunica vaginalis. It is usually painless and by the time the patient seeks help, it may be difficult to be sure that the swelling is not due to a testicular tumour. Indeed, a tumour may present as a haematocele.
- Occasionally, severe infection can be introduced by aspiration. Simple aspiration, however, often may be used as a temporary measure in those cases where surgery is contraindicated or must be postponed.
- Postherniorrhaphy hydrocele is a relatively rare complication of inguinal hernia repair. It is possibly due to interruption to the lymphatics draining the scrotal contents.
- Infection which may lead to pyocele.
- Atrophy of testis in long standing cases.

Complications are often diagnosed post-operatively, which can be differentiated through duplex ultrasound scanning and are not observed until 24 to 48 hours for early complications such as drainage, infection, formation of haematocele, rupture, etc., but also for 1 to 6 weeks during follow-up on out-patient basis.

== Cause ==
A hydrocele can be produced in four ways:

- by excessive production of fluid within the sac, e.g. secondary hydrocele
- through defective absorption of fluid
- by interference with lymphatic drainage of scrotal structures as in case of elephantiasis
- by connection with a hernia of the peritoneal cavity in the congenital variety, which presents as hydrocele of the cord

=== Primary hydroceles ===
The swelling is soft and non-tender, large in size on examination, and the testis cannot usually be felt. The presence of fluid is demonstrated by transillumination. These hydroceles can reach a huge size, containing large amount of fluid, as these are painless and are often ignored. They are otherwise asymptomatic, other than size and weight, causing inconvenience. However the long continued presence of large hydroceles causes atrophy of testis due to compression or by obstructing blood supply. In most cases, the hydrocele, when diagnosed early during complete physical examination, are small and the testis can easily be palpated within a lax hydrocele. However Ultrasound imaging is necessary to visualize the testis if the hydrocele sac is dense to reveal the primary abnormality. But these can become large in cases when left unattended. Hydroceles are usually painless, as are testicular tumors. A common method of diagnosing a hydrocele is by attempting to shine a strong light (transillumination) through the enlarged scrotum. A hydrocele will usually pass light, while a tumor will not (except in the case of a malignancy with reactive hydrocele).

=== Secondary hydroceles ===
Secondary hydroceles due to testicular diseases can be the result of cancer, trauma (such as a hernia), or orchitis (inflammation of testis), and can also occur in infants undergoing peritoneal dialysis. A hydrocele is not a cancer but it should be excluded clinically if a presence of a testicular tumor is suspected, however, there are no publications in the world literature that report a hydrocele in association with testicular cancer. Secondary hydrocele is most frequently associated with acute or chronic epididymo-orchitis. It is also seen with torsion of the testis and with some testicular tumors. A secondary hydrocele is usually lax and of moderate size: the underlying testis is palpable. A secondary hydrocele subsides when the primary lesion resolves.

- Acute/chronic epididymo-orchitis
- Torsion of testis
- Testicular tumor
- Hematocele
- Filarial hydrocele
- Post herniorrhaphy
- Hydrocele of an hernial sac

=== Infantile hydroceles ===
It does not occur only in infants but it occurs in adults also, a hydrocele is usually an expression of a patent processus vaginalis (PPV). The tunica and the processus vaginalis are distended to the inguinal ring but there is no connection with the peritoneal cavity.

=== Congenital hydroceles ===
Communicating hydrocele, caused by the failure of the processus vaginalis closure.

The processus vaginalis is patent and connects with the general peritoneal cavity. The communication is usually too small to allow herniation of intra-abdominal contents. Digital pressure on the hydrocele does not usually empty it, but the hydrocele fluid may drain into the peritoneal cavity when the child is lying down. Ascites or even ascitic tuberculous peritonitis should be considered if the swellings are bilateral.

=== Encysted hydrocele of the cord ===
There is a smooth oval swelling near the spermatic cord which is liable to be mistaken for an inguinal hernia. The swelling moves downwards and becomes less mobile if the testis is pulled gently downwards. Rarely, a hydrocele develops in a remnant of the processus vaginalis somewhere along the course of the spermatic cord. This hydrocele also transilluminates, and is known as an encysted hydrocele of the cord. In females, a related region in females, a multicystic hydrocele of the canal of Nuck sometimes presents as a swelling in the groin. It probably results from cystic degeneration of the round ligament. Unlike a hydrocele of the cord, a hydrocele of the canal of Nuck is always at least partially within the inguinal canal.

The accuracy of the diagnosis must be ascertained. Great care must be taken to differentiate a hydrocele from a scrotal hernia or tumor of the testicle. Ultrasound imaging can be very useful in these cases. A hernia usually can be reduced, transmits a cough impulse, and is not translucent. A hydrocele cannot be reduced into the inguinal canal and gives no impulse on coughing unless a hernia is also present. In young children a hydrocele is often associated with a complete congenital type of hernial sac.

== Diagnosis ==
A primary hydrocele is described as having the following characteristics:

- Transillumination positive
- Fluctuation positive
- Impulse on coughing negative (positive in congenital hydrocele)
- Reducibility absent
- Testis cannot be palpated separately. (exception - funicular hydrocele, encysted hydrocele)

== Treatment ==
Most hydroceles appearing in the first year of life resolve without treatment. Hydroceles that persist after the first year or occur later in life require treatment only in selected cases, such as patients who are symptomatic with pain or a pressure sensation, or when the scrotal skin integrity is compromised from chronic irritation; the treatment of choice is surgery and the operation is conducted via an open access technique aiming to excise the hydrocele sac. Anesthesia is required for the operation; general anesthesia is of choice in children, while spinal anesthesia is usually sufficient in adults. Local infiltration anesthesia is not satisfactory because it cannot abolish abdominal pain due to traction on the spermatic cord. In longstanding cases, hydrocele fluid may be opalescent with cholesterol and may contain crystals of tyrosine.

After aspiration of a primary hydrocele, fluid reaccumulates over the following months and periodic aspiration or operation is needed. For younger patients, operation is usually preferred. Sclerotherapy is an alternative; after aspiration, 6% aqueous phenol (10–20 ml) together with 1% lidocaine for analgesia can be injected, and this often inhibits reaccumulation. These alternative treatments are generally regarded as unsatisfactory because of the high incidence of recurrences and the frequent necessity for repetition of the procedure.
