= Vaginal process =

Embryonic developmental outpouching of the parietal peritoneum

- Schematic drawing of a cross-section through the vaginal process. 1 testicle, 2 Epididymis, 3 Mesorchium, 4 Lamina visceralis of Tunica vaginalis, 5 Lamina parietalis of Tunica vaginalis, 6 Cavum vaginale, 7 Mesepididymis, 8 Fascia spermatica interna

Details
- Days: 84
- Gives rise to: Tunica vaginalis

Identifiers
- Latin: processus vaginalis peritonei masculinus

The vaginal process (or processus vaginalis) is an embryonic developmental outpouching of the parietal peritoneum. It is present from around the 12th week of gestation, and commences as a peritoneal outpouching.

== Sex differences ==
In males, it precedes the testes in their descent down within the gubernaculum, and closes. This closure (also called fusion) occurs at any point from a few weeks before birth, to a few weeks after birth. The remaining portion around the testes becomes the tunica vaginalis. If it does not close in females, it forms the canal of Nuck.

== Clinical significance ==
Failure of closure of the vaginal process leads to the propensity to develop a number of abnormalities. Peritoneal fluid can travel down a patent vaginal process leading to the formation of a hydrocele. Persistent patent processus vaginalis is more common on the right than the left. Accumulation of blood in a persistent processus vaginalis could result in a hematocele.

There is the potential for an indirect inguinal hernia to develop, although not all people with a patent vaginal process will develop one. The more patent the vaginal process, the more likely the patient is to develop a hernia. Congenital malformation of the vaginal process is also the leading cause of testicular torsion, since lack of attachment to the inner lining of the scrotum leaves the testicles free to twist.

== See also ==
- Canal of Nuck
- List of homologues of the human reproductive system
