= Tunica vaginalis =

Pouch of serous membrane that covers the testes

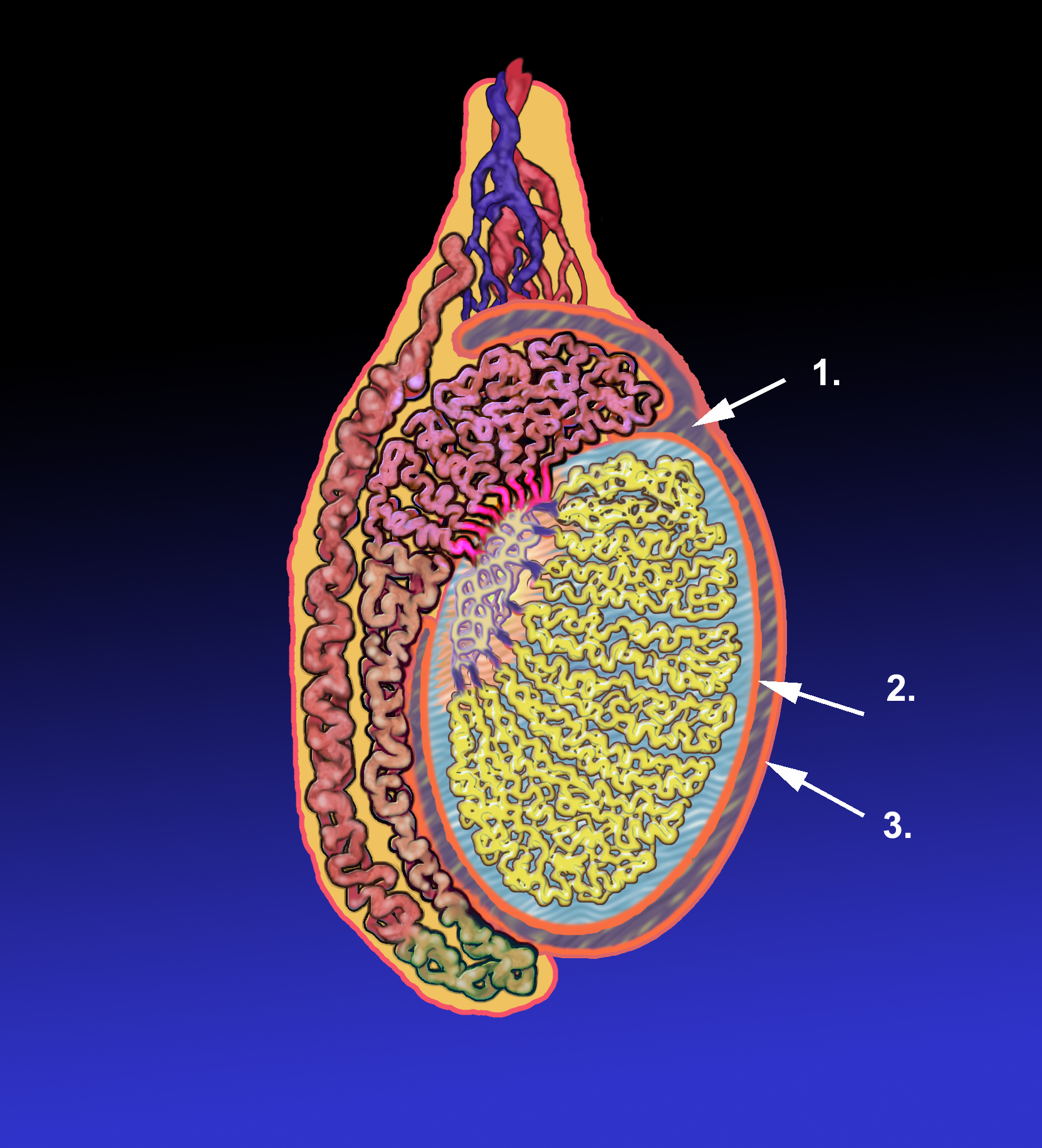
- Diagram of a cross-section of a testicle. 1. Cavity of tunica vaginalis, 2. Visceral lamina, 3. Parietal lamina.

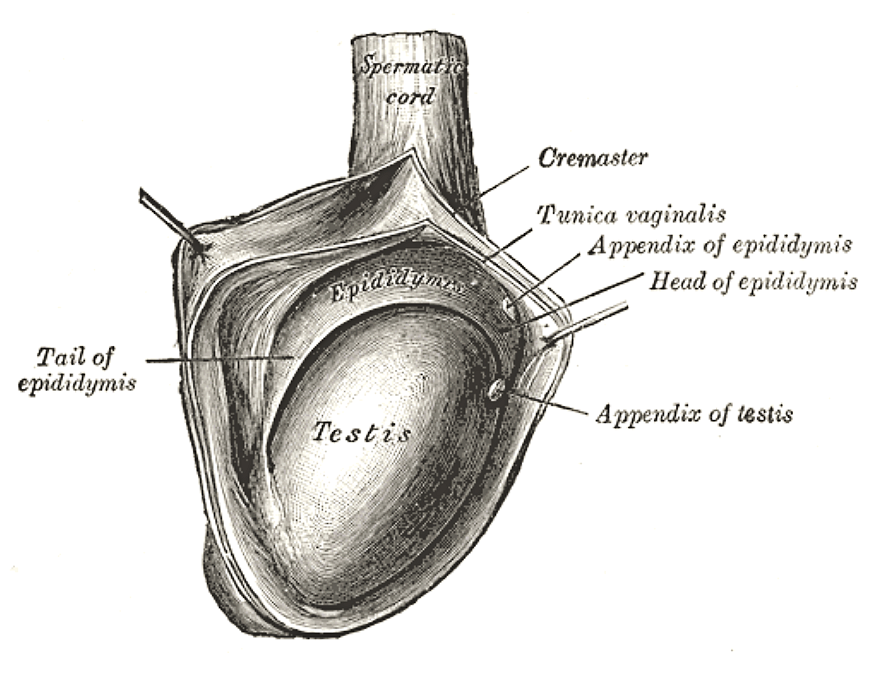
- The right testis, exposed by laying open the tunica vaginalis. (Tunica vaginalis is labeled at upper right.)

Details

Identifiers
- Latin: tunica vaginalis testis

The tunica vaginalis is a pouch of serous membrane within the scrotum that lines the testis and epididymis (visceral layer of tunica vaginalis), and the inner surface of the scrotum (parietal layer of tunica vaginalis). It is the outermost of the three layers that constitute the capsule of the testis, with the tunica albuginea of testis situated beneath it.

It is the remnant of a pouch of peritoneum which is pulled into the scrotum by the testis as it descends out of the abdominal cavity during foetal development.

== Anatomy ==
=== Visceral layer ===
The visceral layer of tunica vaginalis of testis (lamina visceralis tunicae vaginalis testis) is the portion of the tunica vaginalis that covers the testis and epididymis. It is the superficial-most of the three layers that constitute the capsule of the testis, with the tunica albuginea of testis situated deep to it. Posteriorly, the visceral layer does not line the surface of the testis - instead, it passes onto the epididymis where the latter attaches to the testis before continuing onto the inner surface of the scrotum as the parietal layer.

=== Parietal layer ===
The parietal layer of tunica vaginalis of testis (lamina parietalis tunicae vaginalis testis) is the portion of the tunica vaginalis that lines the inner surface of the scrotum. It is supported by the internal spermatic fascia.

=== Cavity of the tunica vaginalis ===
Schematic drawing of a cross-section through the vaginal process. 1 testicle, 2 Epididymis, 3 Mesorchium, 4 Lamina visceralis of Tunica vaginalis, 5 Lamina parietalis of Tunica vaginalis, 6 Cavum vaginale, 7 Epididymis, 8 Fascia spermatica interna

The cavity of the tunica vaginalis (also: cavum of the tunica vaginalis, or cavum vaginale) is the cavity between the visceral layer and the parietal layer of tunica vaginalis. It is normally occupied by a small amount of clear, lightly coloured fluid.

The volume of the fluid in the cavity may increase abnormally when lymphatic drainage is impeded (due to inflammation, neoplasm, or trauma).

== Development ==
The tunica vaginalis is derived from the vaginal process of the peritoneum, which in the fetus precedes the descent of the testes from the abdomen into the scrotum. The vaginal process between the abdominal inguinal ring and the superior part of the testis is then obliterated, usually leaving a string-like or cord-like remnant adjacent to the spermatic cord. If the vaginal process fails to obliterate, the communication between the peritoneal cavity and scrotum persists after birth, predisposing the individual to indirect inguinal hernia, and hydrocele testis.

== Diseases ==
- Mesothelioma
- Hydrocele
- Cartilaginous bodies
- Hematocele
