= Lumbar plexus =

Web of nerves in the lower spine

- Plan of lumbar plexus.

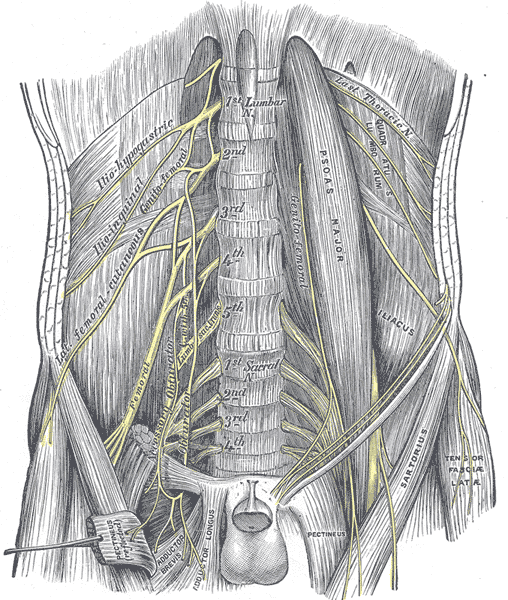
- The lumbar plexus and its branches.

Details
- From: T12, L1–L4

Identifiers
- Latin: plexus lumbalis plexus lumbaris
- TA98: A14.2.07.002
- TA2: 6517
- FMA: 5908

The lumbar plexus is a web of nerves (a nerve plexus) in the lumbar region of the body which forms part of the larger lumbosacral plexus. It is formed by the divisions of the first four lumbar nerves (L1–L4) and from contributions of the subcostal nerve (T12), which is the last thoracic nerve. Additionally, the ventral rami of the fourth lumbar nerve pass communicating branches, the lumbosacral trunk, to the sacral plexus. The nerves of the lumbar plexus pass in front of the hip joint and mainly support the anterior part of the thigh.

The plexus is formed lateral to the intervertebral foramina and passes through psoas major. Its smaller motor branches are distributed directly to psoas major, while the larger branches leave the muscle at various sites to run obliquely down through the pelvis to leave under the inguinal ligament with the exception of the obturator nerve which exits the pelvis through the obturator foramen.

== Branches ==
The iliohypogastric nerve runs posterior to the psoas major on its proximal lateral border to run laterally and obliquely on the anterior side of quadratus lumborum. Lateral to this muscle, it pierces the transversus abdominis to run above the iliac crest between that muscle and abdominal internal oblique. It gives off several motor branches to these muscles and a sensory branch to the skin of the lateral hip. Its terminal branch then runs parallel to the inguinal ligament to exit the aponeurosis of the abdominal external oblique above the external inguinal ring where it supplies the skin above the inguinal ligament (i.e. the hypogastric region) with the anterior cutaneous branch.

The ilioinguinal nerve closely follows the iliohypogastric nerve on the quadratus lumborum, but then passes below it to run at the level of the iliac crest. It pierces the lateral abdominal wall and runs medially at the level of the inguinal ligament where it supplies motor branches to both transversus abdominis and sensory branches through the external inguinal ring to the skin over the pubic symphysis and the lateral aspect of the labia majora or scrotum.

The genitofemoral nerve pierces psoas major anteriorly below the former two nerves to immediately split into two branches that run downward on the anterior side of the muscle. The lateral femoral branch is purely sensory. It pierces the vascular lacuna near the saphenous hiatus and supplies the skin below the inguinal ligament (i.e. proximal, lateral aspect of femoral triangle). The genital branch differs in males and females. In males it runs in the spermatic cord and in females in the inguinal canal together with the teres uteri ligament. It then sends sensory branches to the scrotal skin in males and the labia majora in females. In males it supplies motor innervation to the cremaster.

The lateral cutaneous femoral nerve pierces psoas major on its lateral side and runs obliquely downward below the iliac fascia. Medial to the anterior superior iliac spine it leaves the pelvic area through the lateral muscular lacuna it enters the thigh by passing behind the lateral end of the inguinal ligament . In the thigh it briefly passes under the fascia lata before it breaches the fascia and supplies the skin of the anterior thigh.

The obturator nerve leaves the lumbar plexus and descends behind psoas major on it medial side, then follows the linea terminalis into the lesser pelvis, and finally leaves the pelvic area through the obturator canal. In the thigh, it sends motor branches to obturator externus before dividing into an anterior and a posterior branch, both of which continues distally. These branches are separated by adductor brevis and supply all thigh adductors with motor innervation: pectineus, adductor longus, adductor brevis, adductor magnus, adductor minimus, and gracilis. The anterior branch contributes a terminal, sensory branch which passes along the anterior border of gracilis and supplies the skin on the medial, distal part of the thigh.

The femoral nerve is the largest and longest of the plexus' nerves. It gives motor innervation to iliopsoas, pectineus, sartorius, and quadriceps femoris; and sensory innervation to the anterior thigh, posterior lower leg, and hindfoot. In the pelvic area, it runs in a groove between psoas major and iliacus giving off branches to both muscles, and exits the pelvis through the medial aspect of muscular lacuna. In the thigh it divides into numerous sensory and muscular branches and the saphenous nerve, its long sensory terminal branch which continues down to the foot.

Nerves of the lumbar plexus
Nerve	Segment	Innervated muscles	Cutaneous branches
Iliohypogastric	T12-L1	• Transversus abdominis • Abdominal internal oblique	• Anterior cutaneous ramus • Lateral cutaneous ramus
Ilioinguinal	L1	• Transversus abdominis • Abdominal internal oblique	• Anterior scrotal nerves in males • Anterior labial nerves in females
Genitofemoral	L1–L2	• Cremaster in males	• Femoral ramus • Genital ramus
Lateral femoral cutaneous	L2–L3		• Lateral femoral cutaneous
Obturator	L2–L4	• Obturator externus • Adductor longus • Adductor brevis • Gracilis • Pectineus • Adductor magnus	• Cutaneous ramus
Femoral	L2–L4	• Iliacus • Pectineus • Sartorius • Quadriceps femoris	• Anterior cutaneous branches • Saphenous
Direct branches from plexus to muscle
Short, direct branches	L1–L3	• Psoas major	
Short, direct branches	T12-L4	• Quadratus lumborum • Lumbar intertransverse	

== Additional images ==
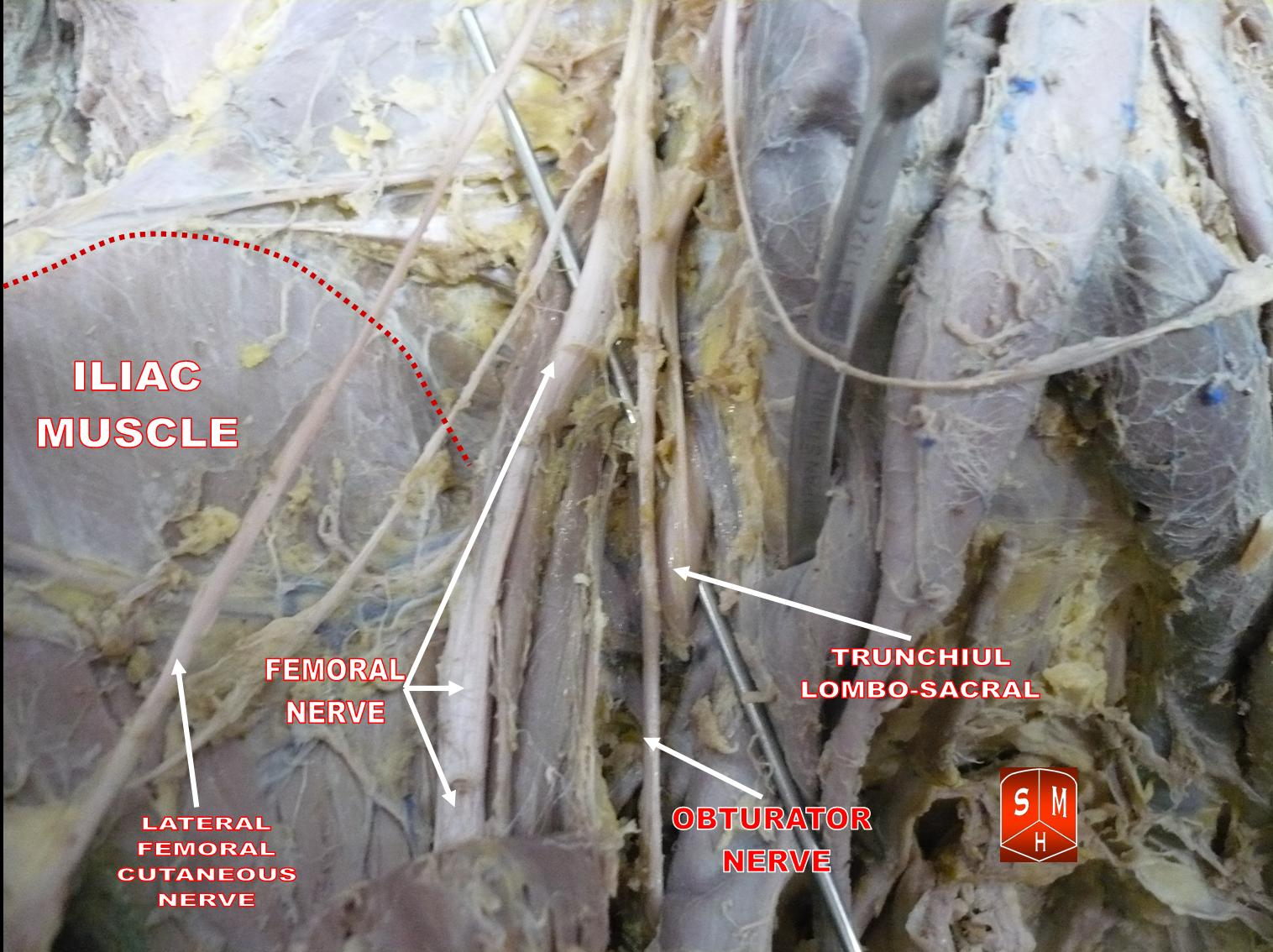
Lumbar plexus after dissection

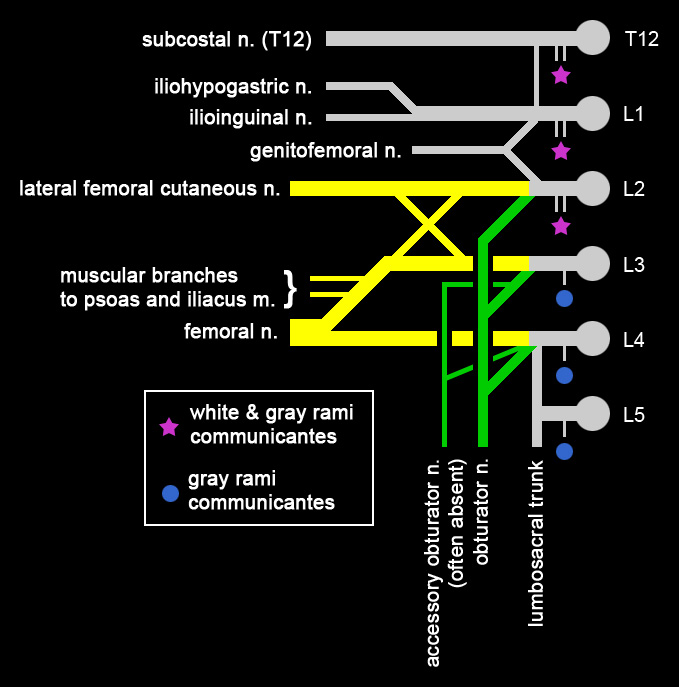
Schematic diagram of the lumbar plexus
