= Transverse abdominis plane block =

A transverse abdominis plane block, also called TAP block, is a regional technique to provide analgesia after lower abdominal wall operations. The techniques was first introduced by Rafi in 2001. It is performed by injecting local anesthetic (commonly Ropivacaine or Bupivacaine) under ultrasound guidance between the plane of the internal oblique muscles and the transversalis muscles. The intercostal, subcostal, hypogastric, and ilioinguinal nerves are blocked. Duration of the block depends on the volume and concentration of the local anesthetic injected as well as any additives used, such as epinephrine.

The TAP block was the original fascial plane block for abdominal surgery. However, there are many alternatives with comparable or better analgesic efficacy
