= Abdominal muscles =

Muscles of the abdomen

Abdominal muscles cover the anterior and lateral abdominal region and meet at the anterior midline. These muscles of the anterolateral abdominal wall can be divided into four groups: the external obliques, the internal obliques, the transversus abdominis, and the rectus abdominis.

== Anterior abdominal wall ==
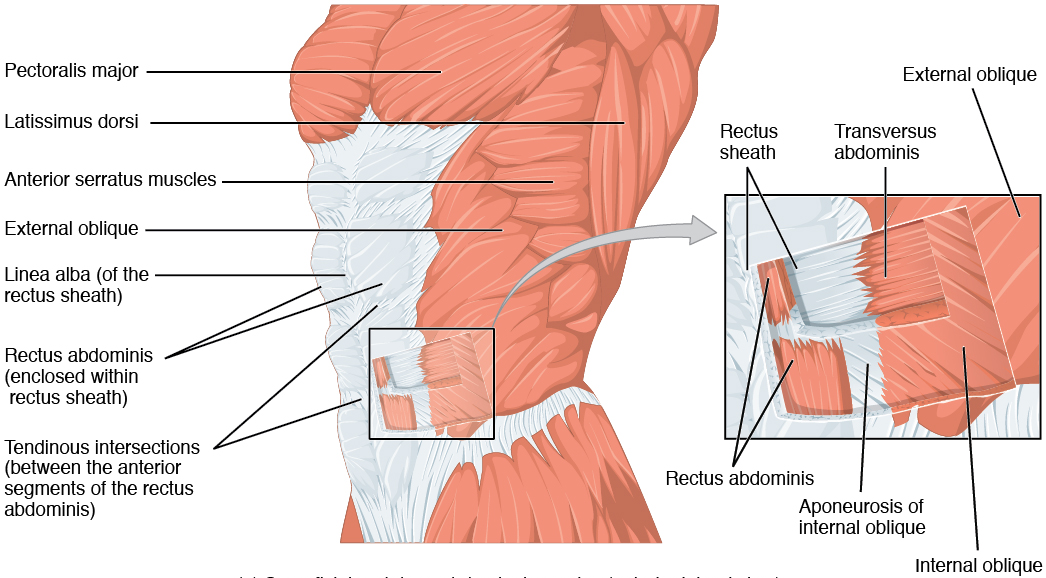
Anterolateral view of the muscles of the abdomen

There are three flat skeletal muscles in the antero-lateral wall of the abdomen. The external oblique, closest to the surface, extend inferiorly and medially, in the direction of sliding one’s four fingers into pants pockets. Perpendicular to it is the intermediate internal oblique, extending superiorly and medially, the direction the thumbs usually go when the other fingers are in the pants pocket. The deep muscle, the transversus abdominis, is arranged transversely around the abdomen, similar to the front of a belt on a pair of pants. This arrangement of three bands of muscles in different orientations allows various movements and rotations of the trunk. The three layers of muscle also help to protect the internal abdominal organs in an area where there is no bone.

== Linea alba ==
The linea alba is a white, fibrous band that is made of the bilateral rectus sheaths that join at the anterior midline of the body. These enclose the rectus abdominis muscles (a pair of long, linear muscles, commonly called the “sit-up” muscles) that originate at the pubic crest and pubic symphysis, and extend the length of the body’s trunk. Each muscle is segmented by three transverse bands of collagen fibers called the tendinous intersections. This results in the look of “six-pack abs,” as each segment hypertrophies on individuals at the gym who do many sit-ups.

== Posterior abdominal wall ==
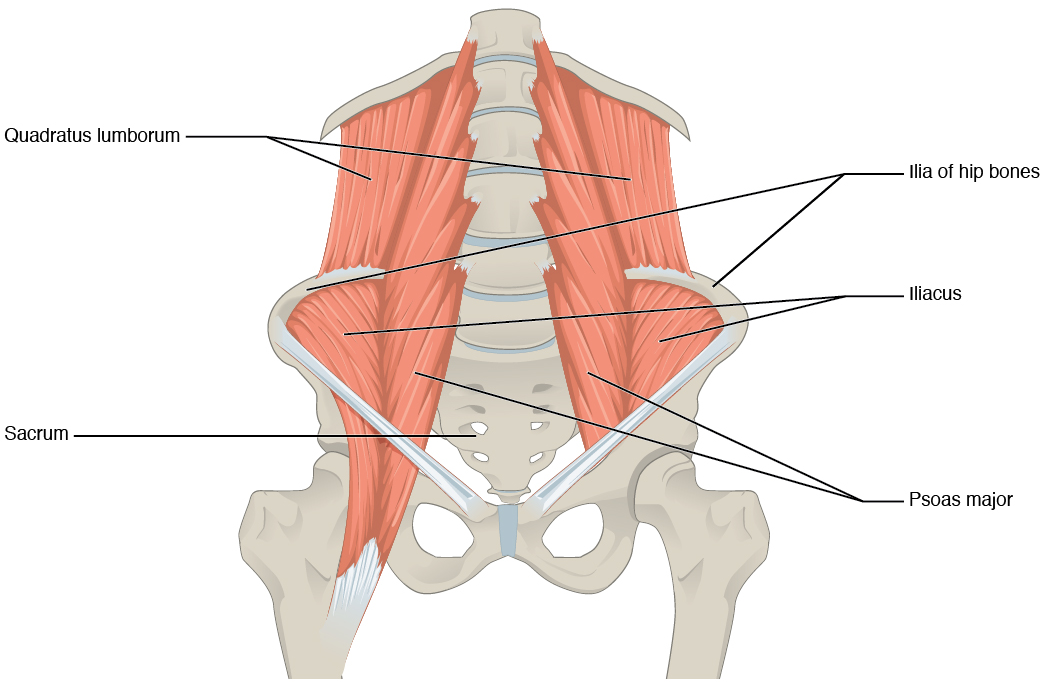
Muscles of the posterior abdominal wall

The posterior abdominal wall is formed by the lumbar vertebrae, parts of the ilia of the hip bones, psoas major and iliacus muscles, and quadratus lumborum muscle. This part of the core plays a key role in stabilizing the rest of the body and maintaining posture.

== Functions ==
Movement	Target	Target motion direction	Prime mover	Origin	Insertion
Twisting at waist; also bending to the side	Vertebral column	Supination; lateral flexion	External obliques; internal obliques	Ribs 5–12; ilium	Ribs 7–10; linea alba; ilium
Squeezing abdomen during forceful exhalations, defecation, urination, and childbirth	Abdominal cavity	Compression	Transversus abdominis	Ilium; ribs 5–10	Sternum; linea alba; pubis
Sitting up	Vertebral column	Flexion	Rectus abdominis	Pubis	Sternum; ribs 5 and 7
Bending to the side	Vertebral column	Lateral flexion	Quadratus lumborum	Ilium; ribs 5–10	Rib 12; vertebrae L1–L4

== Source text ==
This article incorporates text from a free content work. Licensed under CC BY 4.0. Text taken from Anatomy and Physiology, J. Gordon Betts et al, Openstax.
