= Abdominis =

The term abdominis is an old Latin term for abdomen. It refers to the region of the body between the chest and the pelvis, also known as the belly.

In modern times, it is still used in anatomical classification of muscles in the human abdomen.

The abdominal wall is made up of several layers of muscles, which are collectively known as the abdominal muscles. These muscles support the spine, protect the internal organs, and help with movement. The five main abdominal muscles are:

- Rectus abdominis muscle
- External obliques muscle
- Internal obliques muscle
- Pyramidalis muscle
- Transverse abdominal muscle
