= Iliohypogastric nerve =

Nerve in the human torso

- Plan of lumbar plexus. (Iliohypogastric visible at upper left.)

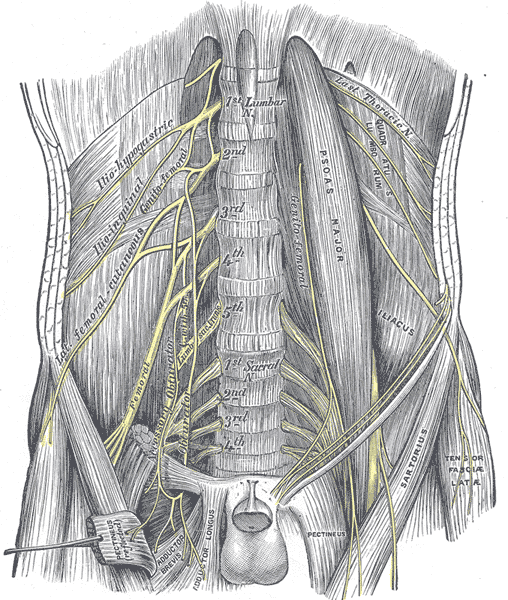
- The lumbar plexus and its branches. (Iliohypogastric visible at upper left.)

Details
- From: Lumbar plexus
- Innervates: Sensory: Skin over the lateral gluteal region and above the pubis Motor: internal oblique and transverse abdominal muscles

Identifiers
- Latin: nervus iliohypogastricus
- TA98: A14.2.07.003
- TA2: 6496
- FMA: 16482

The iliohypogastric nerve is a nerve that originates from the lumbar plexus that supplies sensation to skin over the lateral gluteal and hypogastric regions and motor to the internal oblique muscles and transverse abdominal muscles.

== Structure ==
=== Origin ===
The iliohypogastric nerve originates from the superior branch of the anterior ramus of spinal nerve L1. It also receives fibers from T12 via the subcostal nerve. The branch below it is the ilioinguinal nerve.

=== Course ===
It emerges from the upper lateral border of the psoas major. It then crosses in front of the quadratus lumborum muscle to an area superior to the iliac crest. It runs behind the kidneys. Just superior to the iliac crest, it pierces the posterior part of the transversus abdominis muscle and continues anteriorly in the abdominal wall between the transversus abdominis and internal oblique muscles.

It divides into a lateral cutaneous branch and an anterior cutaneous branch between the transversus abdominis muscle and the internal oblique muscle.

=== Branches ===
==== Lateral cutaneous branch ====
The lateral cutaneous branch ("iliac branch") pierces the internal oblique muscles and the external oblique muscles immediately above the iliac crest. It is distributed to the skin of the gluteal region, behind the lateral cutaneous branch of the subcostal nerve; the size of this branch bears an inverse proportion to that of the lateral cutaneous branch of the subcostal nerve.

When harvesting bone from the anterior iliac crest (AICBG), the lateral cutaneous branch of the Iliohypogastric nerve (L1) is most likely to be injured.

Area supplied by the lateral cutaneous branch can be seen in blue near the hip.

==== Anterior cutaneous branch ====
The anterior cutaneous branch ("hypogastric branch") continues onward between the abdominal internal oblique and transverse muscles.

It then pierces the internal oblique, becomes cutaneous by perforating the aponeurosis of the external oblique about 2.5 cm above the subcutaneous inguinal ring, and is distributed to the skin of the hypogastric region.

=== Communications ===
The iliohypogastric nerve communicates with the subcostal nerve and ilioinguinal nerves.

=== Variation ===
The iliohypogastric nerve may be absent in up to 20% of people. Its fibres are instead carried on other nerves, such as the ilioinguinal nerve.

== Function ==
The iliohypogastric nerve partially supplies the internal oblique muscles. It also provides sensory innervation to the superior gluteal region and part of the suprapubic region.

== Clinical significance ==
The iliohypogastric nerve may be damaged at the points where it passes through the internal oblique muscle and the external oblique muscles. It is most often damaged as a result of surgical complications. It may also be damaged by a nerve lesion.
