= Obliqui =

Obliqui may refer to:

- Abdominal internal oblique muscle
- Abdominal external oblique muscle
