= Subcostal nerve =

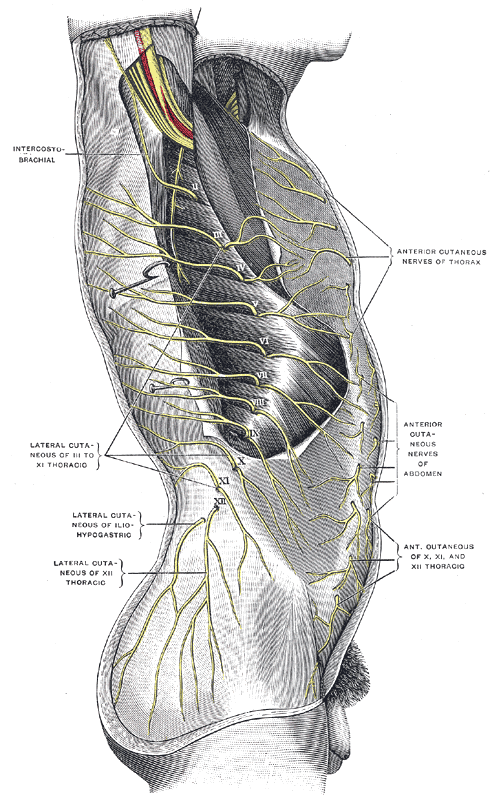
- Cutaneous distribution of thoracic nerves.

Details
- From: T12

Identifiers
- Latin: nervus subcostalis
- TA98: A14.2.04.016
- TA2: 6485
- FMA: 65567

The subcostal nerve (anterior division of the twelfth thoracic nerve) is a mixed motor and sensory nerve contributing to the lumbar plexus. It runs along the lower border of the twelfth rib, often gives a communicating branch to the first lumbar nerve, and passes under the lateral lumbocostal arch.

It then runs in front of the quadratus lumborum, innervates the transversus, and passes forward between it and the abdominal internal oblique to be distributed in the same manner as the lower intercostal nerves.

It communicates with the iliohypogastric nerve and the ilioinguinal nerve of the lumbar plexus, and gives a branch to the pyramidalis muscle and the quadratus lumborum muscle. It also gives off a lateral cutaneous branch that supplies sensory innervation to the skin over the hip.

== Additional images ==
Nervous system

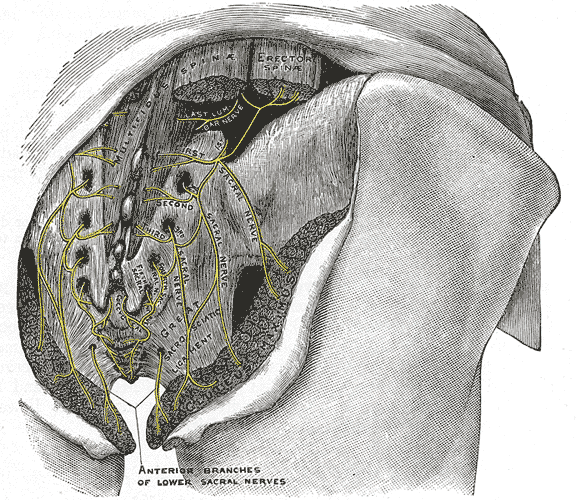
The posterior divisions of the sacral nerves.

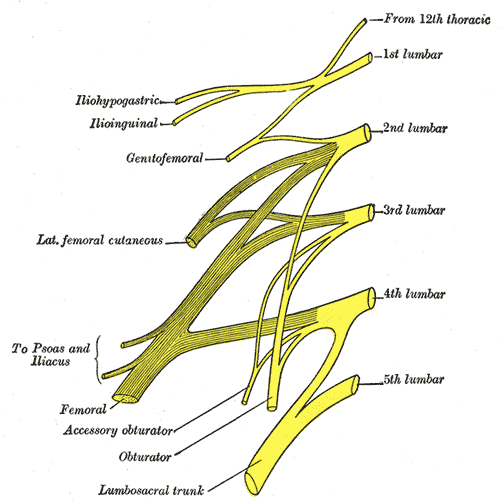
Plan of lumbar plexus.

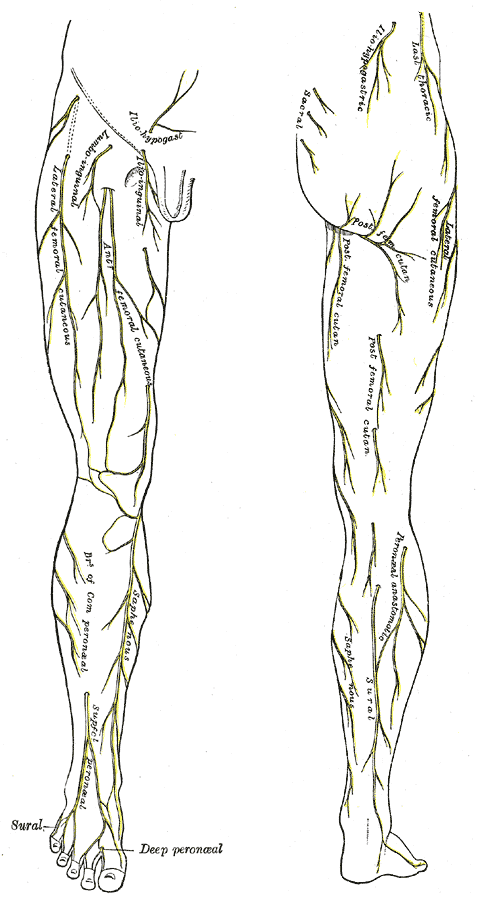
Cutaneous nerves of the right lower extremity. Front and posterior views.

== See also ==
- Subcostal artery
- Subcostal vein
