= Abdominal oblique muscle =

Abdominal oblique muscle may refer to:

- Abdominal external oblique muscle
- Abdominal internal oblique muscle
