= Oblique muscle of abdomen =

Oblique muscle of abdomen may refer to:

- Abdominal external oblique muscle
- Abdominal internal oblique muscle
