= TA muscle =

TA muscle can refer to:

- Tibialis anterior muscle
- Transversus abdominis muscle
