= Lumbar nerves =

Spinal nerves emerging from the lumbar vertebrae

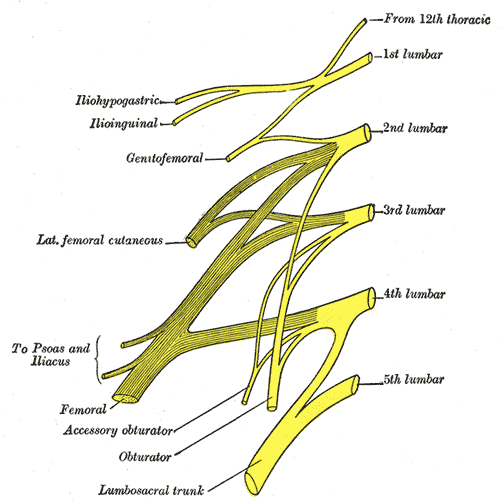
- Plan of lumbar plexus.

Details

Identifiers
- Latin: nervi lumbales
- TA98: A14.2.05.001
- TA2: 6489
- FMA: 5861

The lumbar nerves are the five pairs of spinal nerves emerging from the lumbar vertebrae. They are divided into posterior and anterior divisions.

== Structure ==
The lumbar nerves are five spinal nerves which arise from either side of the spinal cord below the thoracic spinal cord and above the sacral spinal cord. They arise from the spinal cord between each pair of lumbar spinal vertebrae and travel through the intervertebral foramina. The nerves then split into an anterior branch, which travels forward, and a posterior branch, which travels backwards and supplies the area of the back.

=== Posterior divisions ===
The middle divisions of the posterior branches run close to the articular processes of the vertebrae and end in the multifidus muscle. The outer branches supply the erector spinae muscles.

The nerves give off branches to the skin. These pierce the aponeurosis of the greater trochanter.

=== Anterior divisions ===
The anterior divisions of the lumbar nerves (Latin: rami anteriores) increase in size from above downward.

The anterior divisions communicate with the sympathetic trunk. Near the origin of the divisions, they are joined by gray rami communicantes from the lumbar ganglia of the sympathetic trunk. These rami consist of long, slender branches which accompany the lumbar arteries around the sides of the vertebral bodies, beneath the Psoas major. Their arrangement is somewhat irregular: one ganglion may give rami to two lumbar nerves, or one lumbar nerve may receive rami (branches) from two ganglia. The first and second, and sometimes the third and fourth lumbar nerves are each connected with the lumbar part of the sympathetic trunk by a white ramus communicans.

The nerves pass obliquely outward behind the Psoas major, or between its fasciculi, distributing filaments to it and the Quadratus lumborum.

As the nerves travel forward, they create nervous plexuses. The first three lumbar nerves, and the greater part of the fourth together form the lumbar plexus. The smaller part of the fourth joins with the fifth to form the lumbosacral trunk, which assists in the formation of the sacral plexus.

The fourth nerve is named the furcal nerve, from the fact that it is subdivided between the two plexuses.

== Divisions ==
=== First lumbar nerve ===
The first lumbar spinal nerve (L1) originates from the spinal column from below the lumbar vertebra 1 (L1). The three terminal branches of this nerve are the iliohypogastric, ilioinguinal, and the genitofemoral nerves.

L1 supplies many muscles, either directly or through nerves originating from L1. They may be innervated with L1 as single origin, or be innervated partly by L1 and partly by other spinal nerves. The muscles are:

- quadratus lumborum (partly)
- iliopsoas muscle (partly)

=== Second lumbar nerve ===
The second lumbar spinal nerve (L2) originates from the spinal column from below the lumbar vertebra 2 (L2).

L2 supplies many muscles, either directly or through nerves originating from L2. They may be innervated with L2 as single origin, or be innervated partly by L2 and partly by other spinal nerves. The muscles are:

- quadratus lumborum (partly)
- iliopsoas (partly)

=== Third lumbar nerve ===
The third lumbar spinal nerve (L3) originates from the spinal column from below the lumbar vertebra 3 (L3).

L3 supplies many muscles, either directly or through nerves originating from L3. They may be innervated with L3 as single origin, or be innervated partly by L3 and partly by other spinal nerves. The muscles are:

- quadratus lumborum (partly)
- iliopsoas (partly)
- obturator externus (partly)

=== Fourth lumbar nerve ===
The fourth lumbar spinal nerve (L4) originates from the spinal column from below the lumbar vertebra 4 (L4).

L4 supplies many muscles, either directly or through nerves originating from L4. They are not innervated with L4 as single origin, but partly by L4 and partly by other spinal nerves. The muscles are:

- quadratus lumborum
- gluteus medius muscle
- gluteus minimus muscle
- tensor fasciae latae
- obturator externus
- inferior gemellus
- quadratus femoris
- tibialis anterior
- vastus lateralis

=== Fifth lumbar nerve ===
The fifth lumbar spinal nerve 5 (L5) originates from the spinal column from below the lumbar vertebra 5 (L5).

L5 supplies many muscles, either directly or through nerves originating from L5. They are not innervated with L5 as single origin, but partly by L5 and partly by other spinal nerves. The muscles are:

- gluteus maximus muscle mainly S1
- gluteus medius muscle
- gluteus minimus muscle
- tensor fasciae latae
- tibialis anterior
- tibialis posterior
- extensor digitorum brevis
- extensor hallucis longus
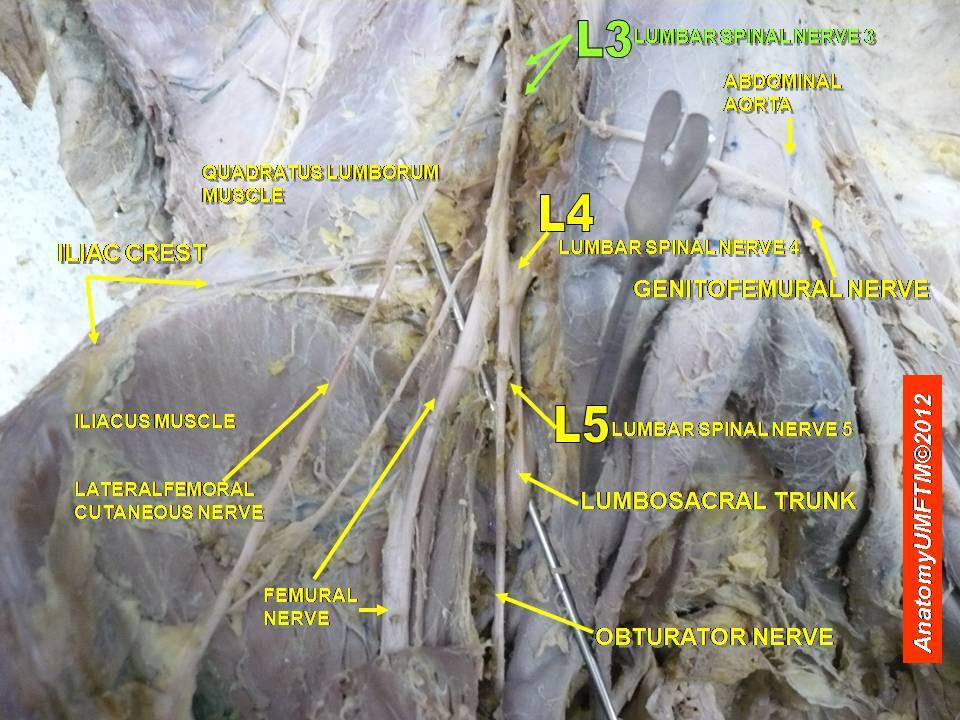
Lumbar spinal nerve 3

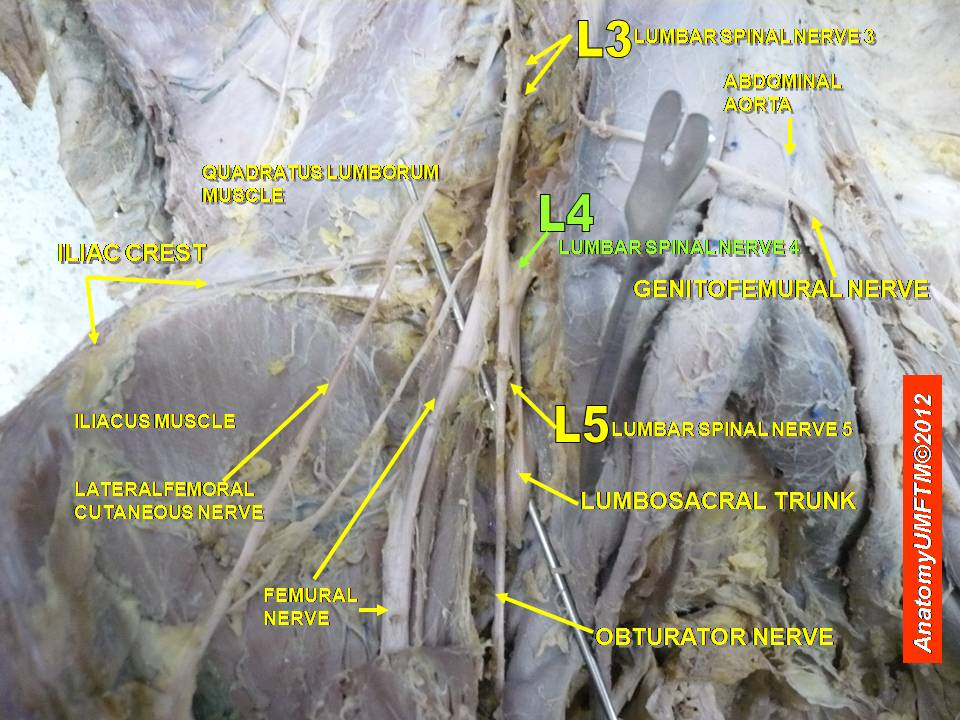
Lumbar spinal nerve 4

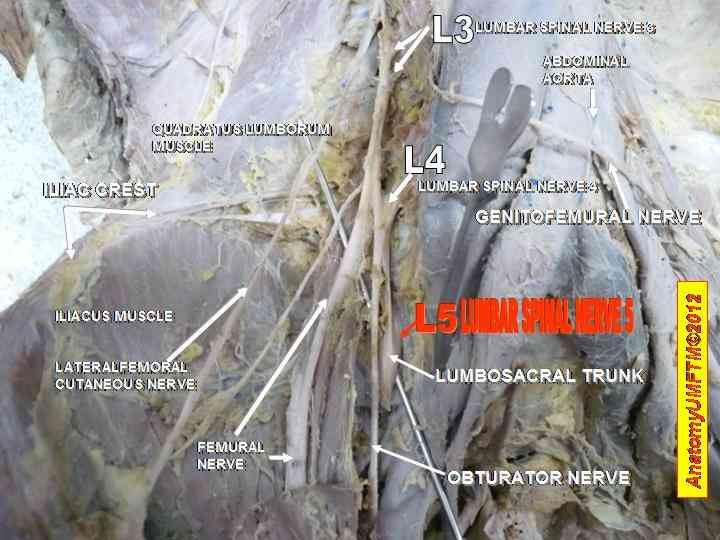
Lumbar spinal nerve 5

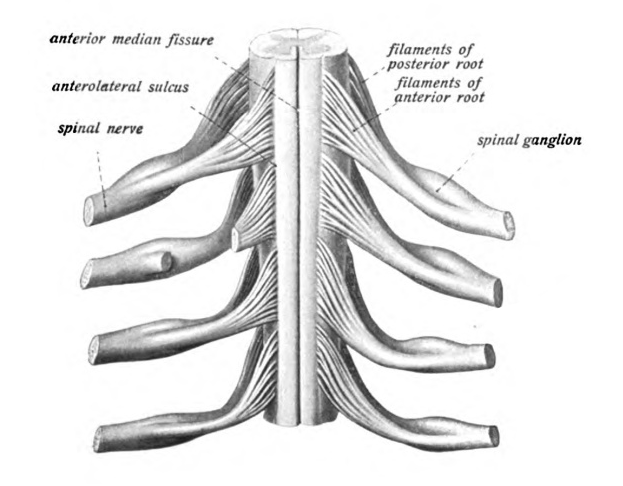
The spinal cord with spinal nerves

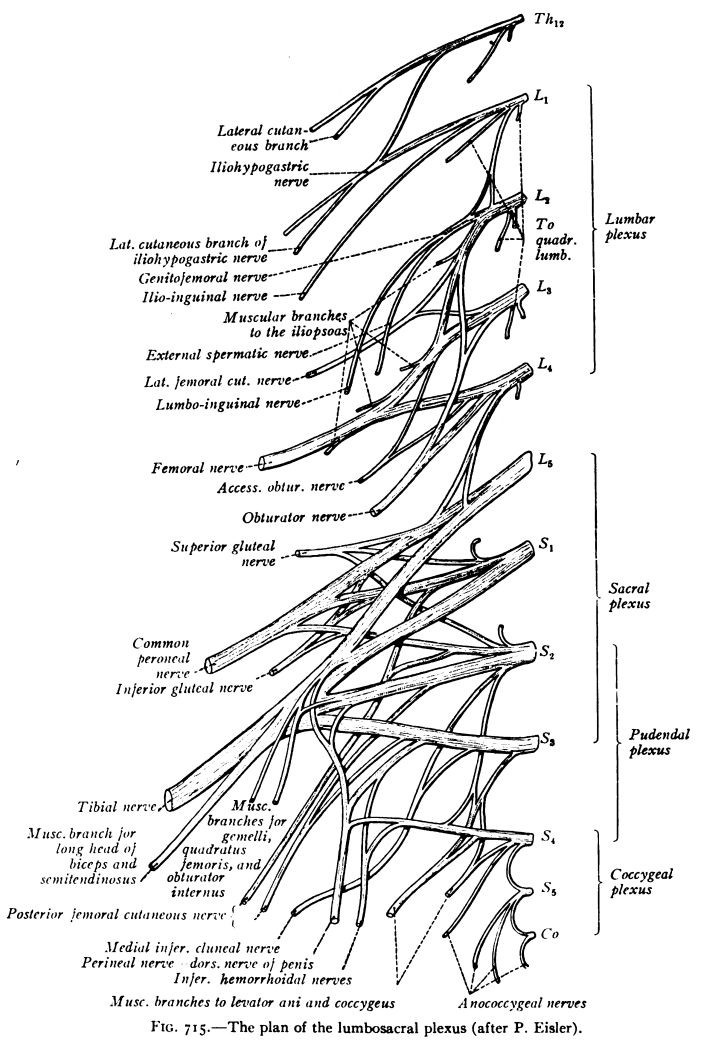
The plan of the lumbosacral plexus

== Function ==
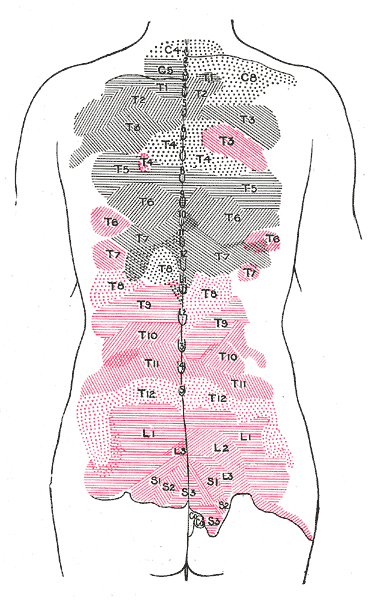
Areas of distribution of the cutaneous branches of the posterior divisions of the spinal nerves. The areas of the medial branches are in black, those of the lateral in red.

== Additional images ==
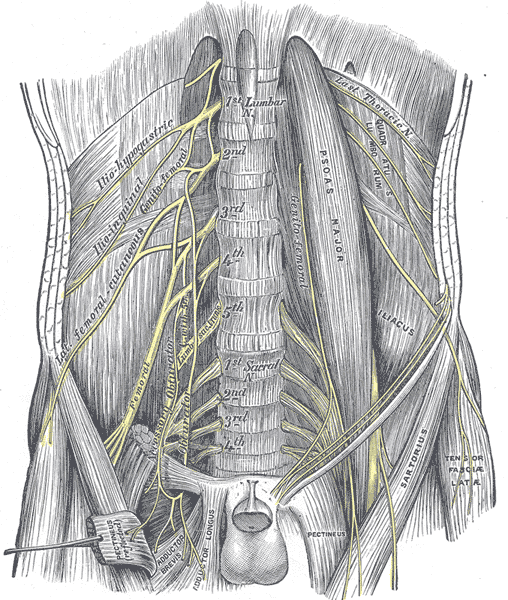
The lumbar plexus and its branches.

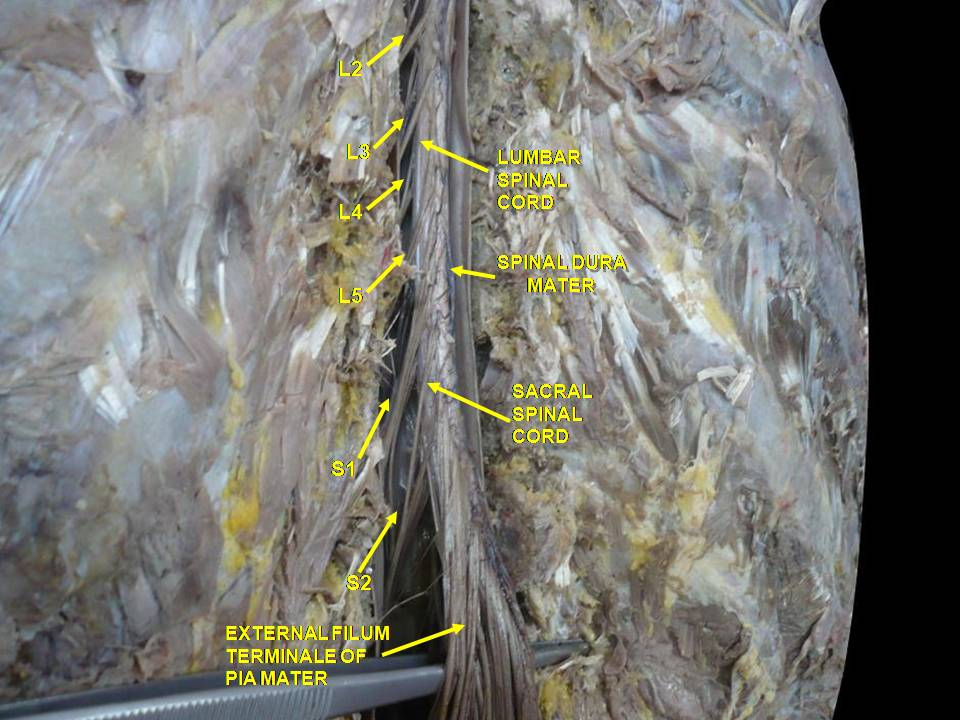
Lumbar spinal nerves.Deep dissection. Posterior view.

== See also ==
- Lumbar plexus
