= Subcostal arteries =

Details
- Source: Thoracic aorta
- Vein: Subcostal vein

Identifiers
- Latin: arteria subcostalis
- TA98: A12.2.11.020
- TA2: 4202
- FMA: 4613

The subcostal arteries, so named because they lie below the last ribs, constitute the lowest pair of branches derived from the thoracic aorta, and are in series with the intercostal arteries.

== Anatomy ==
=== Course and relations ===
Each intercostal artery is accompanied by the corresponding (i.e. ipsilateral) subcostal vein and nerve. Each passes along the lower border of the 12th rib.

Before entering the anterior abdominal wall, each runs laterally upon the anterior surface of the lumbar fascia (and thus also anterior to the underlying quadratus lumborum muscle which the lumbar fascia envelops) posterior to the ipsilateral kidney. It then pierces the posterior aponeurosis of the transversus abdominis, thus entering the anterior abdominal wall to course in between the abdominal internal oblique muscle and transverse abdominal muscle (the neurovascular plane of the anterior abdominal wall).

=== Branches ===
Each subcostal artery gives off a posterior branch which has a similar distribution to the posterior ramus of an intercostal artery.

=== Anastomoses ===
It anastomoses with the superior epigastric, lower intercostal, and lumbar arteries.
