= Lumbar branch of iliolumbar artery =

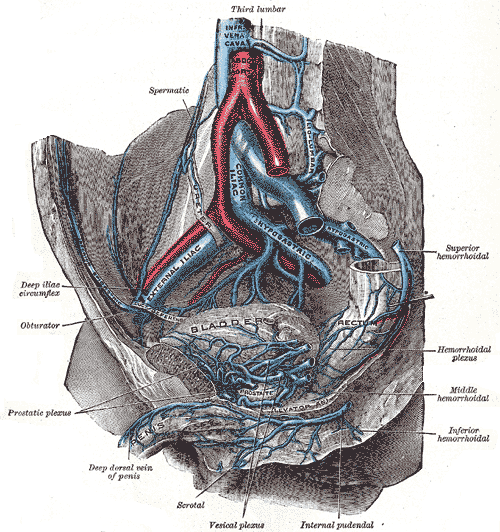
- The veins of the right half of the male pelvis. (Iliolumbar artery not labeled, but Iliolumbar vein visible at center right.)

Details

Identifiers
- Latin: ramus lumbalis arteriae iliolumbalis
- TA98: A12.2.15.003
- TA2: 4305
- FMA: 18849

The lumbar branch of the iliolumbar artery (ramus lumbalis) supplies the psoas major and quadratus lumborum, anastomoses with the last lumbar artery, and sends a small spinal branch through the intervertebral foramen between the last lumbar vertebra and the sacrum, into the vertebral canal to supply the cauda equina.
