= Thoraco-abdominal nerves =

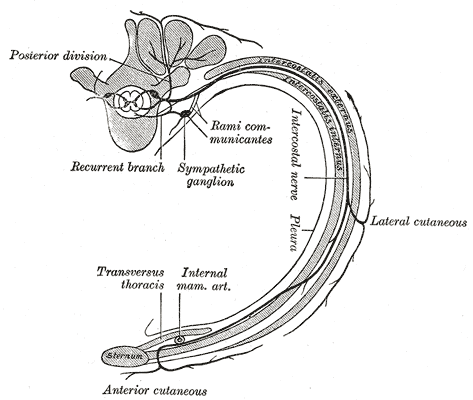
- Diagram of the course and branches of a typical intercostal nerve.

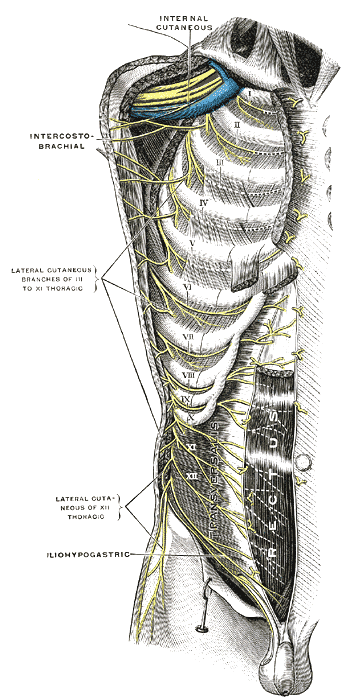
- Intercostal nerves, the superficial muscles having been removed.
- Innervates: Rectus abdominis muscle

The anterior divisions of the seventh, eighth, ninth, tenth, and eleventh thoracic intercostal nerves are continued anteriorly from the intercostal spaces into the abdominal wall; hence they are named thoraco-abdominal nerves (or thoracicoabdominal intercostal nerves).

They have the same arrangement as the upper ones as far as the anterior ends of the intercostal spaces, where they pass behind the costal cartilages, and between the obliquus internus and transversus abdominis, to the sheath of the rectus abdominis, which they perforate.

They supply the rectus abdominis and end as the anterior cutaneous branches of the abdomen; they supply the skin of the front of the abdomen.

The lower intercostal nerves supply the intercostales and abdominal muscles; the last three send branches to the serratus posterior inferior. About the middle of their course they give off lateral cutaneous branches.

These pierce the intercostales externi and the obliquus externus abdominis, in the same line as the lateral cutaneous branches of the upper thoracic nerves, and divide into anterior and posterior branches, which are distributed to the skin of the abdomen and back; the anterior branches supply the digitations of the obliquus externus abdominis, and extend downward and forward nearly as far as the margin of the rectus abdominis; the posterior branches pass backward to supply the skin over the latissimus dorsi.
