= Apollo's belt =

Shallow grooves in the abdomen running from the iliac crest to the pubis

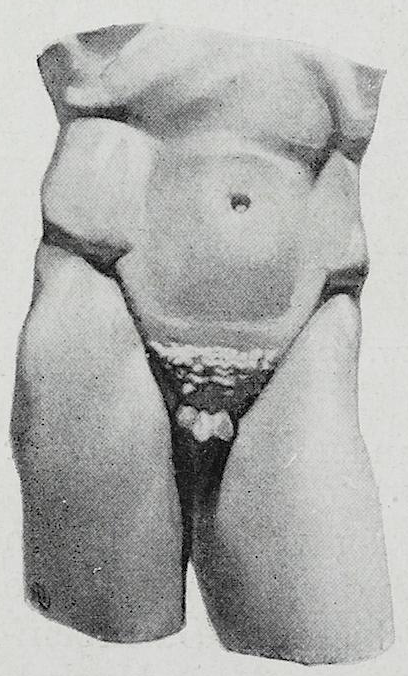
Visible Apollo's belt

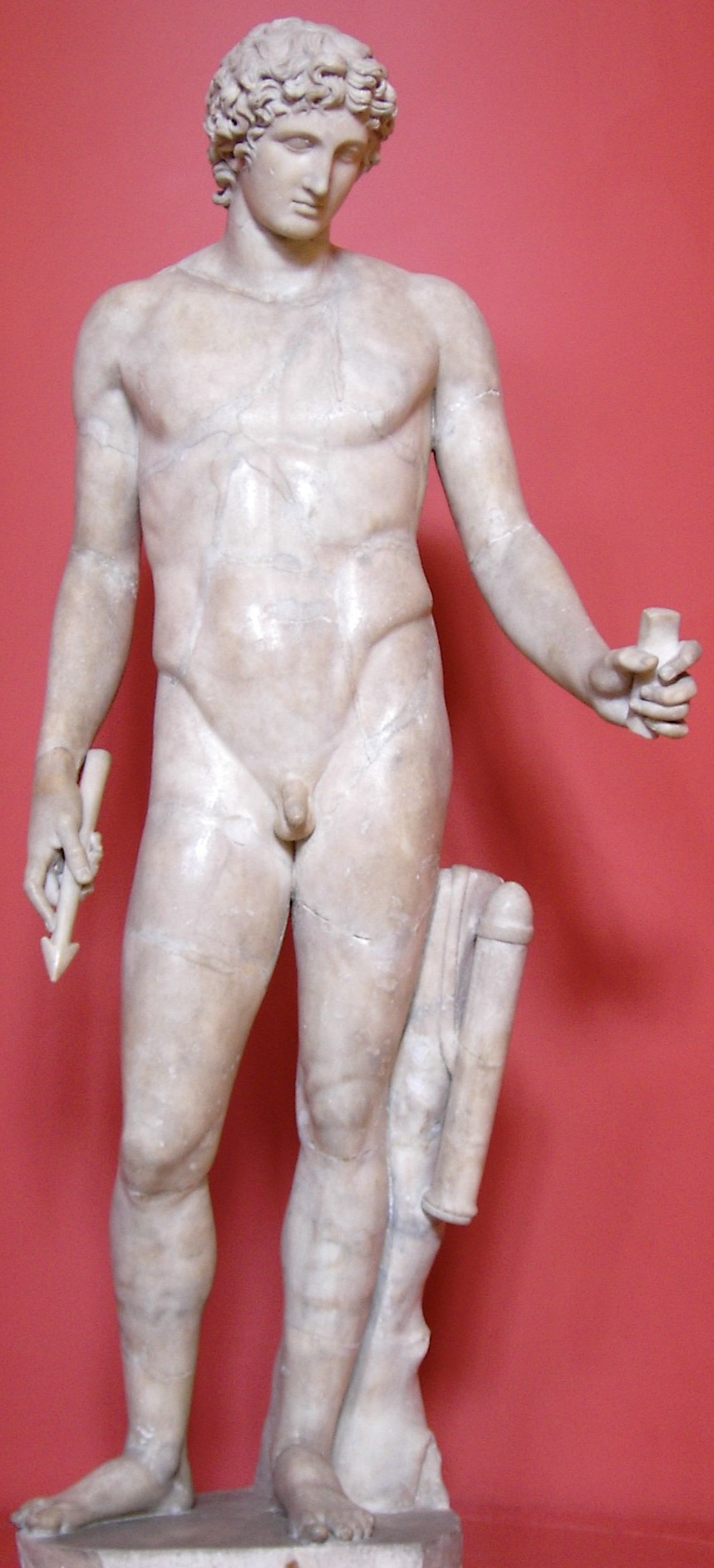
Apollo (the "Adonis" of Centocelle), Roman after a Greek original (Ashmolean Museum)

The Apollo's belt, also known as Adonis belt, or iliac furrows, is a part of the human anatomy referring to the two shallow grooves of the human abdomen running from the iliac crest (hip bone) to the pubis.

The shape of each groove is formed by the inguinal ligament. The visibility of the belt is caused by a low body fat percentage, rather than the creation of new muscle.

The "iliac furrow" is not a currently defined term in Terminologia Anatomica, though it has been used as a formal anatomical term in the past. The term is, however, encountered in modern art history descriptions.
