= Ilioinguinal nerve =

Branch of the first lumbar nerve

- Plan of the lumbar plexus. The ilioinguinal is visible at the upper left.

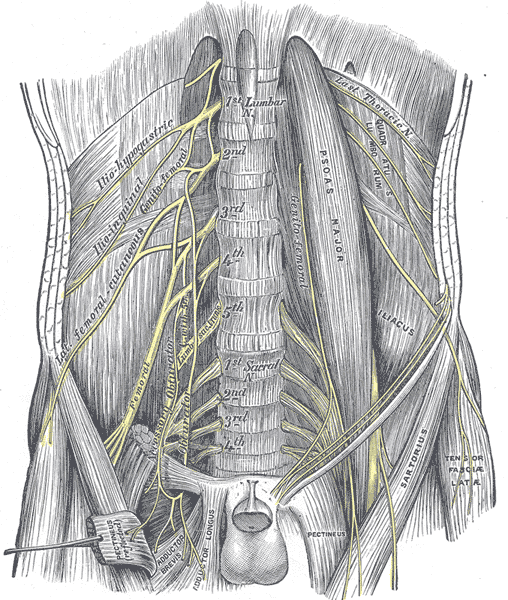
- The lumbar plexus and its branches. The ilioinguinal nerve is visible at the upper left.

Details
- From: lumbar plexus
- Innervates: Skin over the root of the penis and upper part of the scrotum (male), skin covering the mons pubis and labium majus (female). Motor innervation of the transverse abdominus and obliques.

Identifiers
- Latin: nervus ilioinguinalis
- TA98: A14.2.07.006
- TA2: 6499
- FMA: 16483

The ilioinguinal nerve is a branch of the first lumbar nerve (L1). It separates from the first lumbar nerve along with the larger iliohypogastric nerve. It emerges from the lateral border of the psoas major just inferior to the iliohypogastric, and passes obliquely across the quadratus lumborum and iliacus. The ilioinguinal nerve then perforates the transversus abdominis near the anterior part of the iliac crest, and communicates with the iliohypogastric nerve between the transversus and the internal oblique muscle.

It then pierces the internal oblique muscle, distributing filaments to it, and then accompanies the spermatic cord (in males) or the round ligament of uterus (in females) through the superficial inguinal ring. Its fibres are then distributed to the skin of the upper and medial part of the thigh, and to the following locations in the male and female:

- In the male ("anterior scrotal nerve"): to the skin over the root of the penis and upper part of the scrotum.
- In the female ("anterior labial nerve"): to the skin covering the mons pubis and labia majora.

The ilioinguinal nerve does not pass through the deep inguinal ring, and thus only travels through part of the inguinal canal. It mediates the cremasteric reflex.

== Variations ==
The size of this nerve is in inverse proportion to that of the iliohypogastric. Occasionally, it is very small, and ends by joining the iliohypogastric; in such cases, a branch from the iliohypogastric takes the place of the ilioinguinal, or the latter nerve may be altogether absent.

== Ilioinguinal nerve block ==
The ilioinguinal nerve is clinically important when considering an ilioinguinal or iliohypogastric nerve block.

The indications for nerve block include anaesthesia for procedures involving the abdominal region such as inguinal herniorrhaphy or pain relief for procedures such as a caesarean section. Ropivacaine is an example of the anaesthetic which may be used for the block.

== Additional images ==
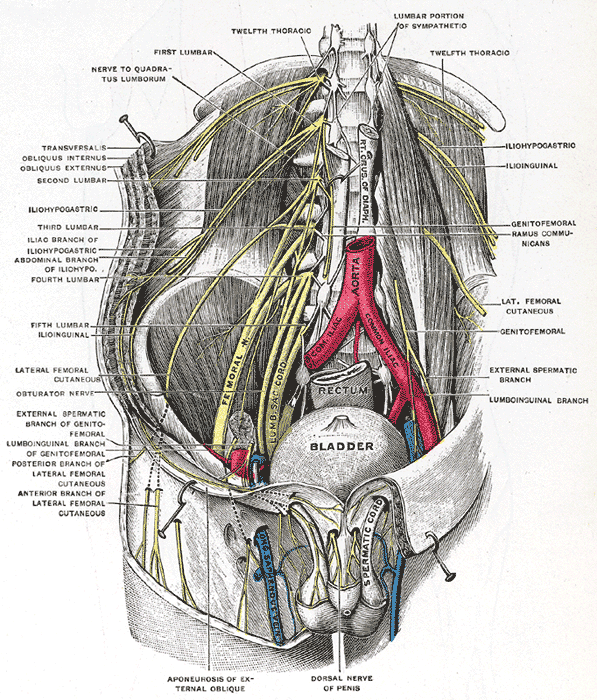
Deep and superficial dissection of the lumbar plexus.

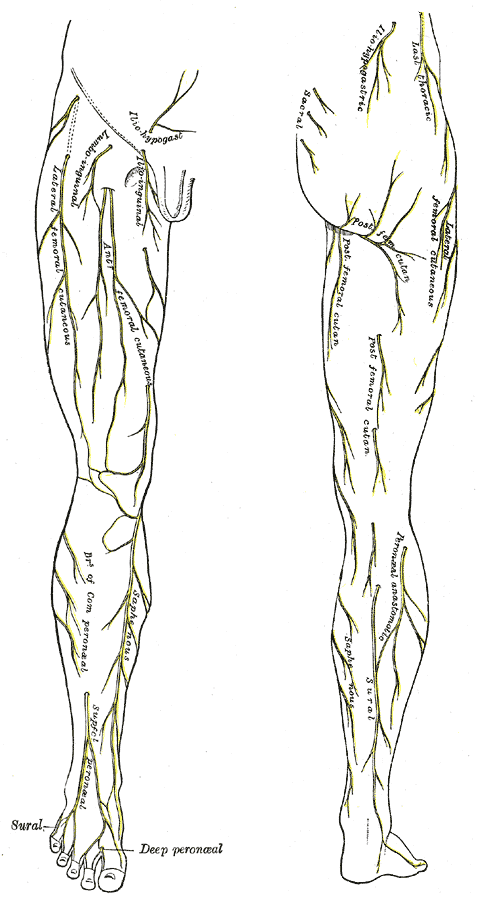
Cutaneous nerves of the right lower extremity. Anterior and posterior views.

Cutaneous nerves of the right lower extremity. Anterior and posterior views.
