= Quadratus lumborum muscle =

Muscle in the lower back

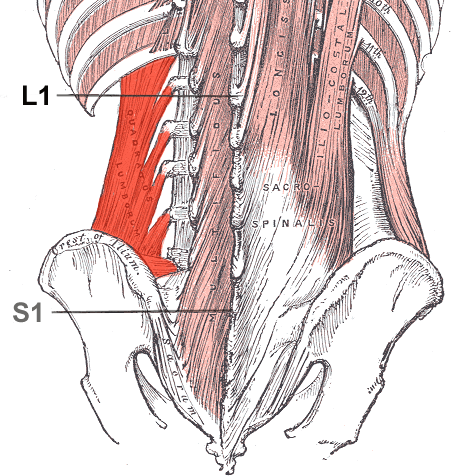
- The left quadratus lumborum, one of the posterior abdominal muscles, is depicted in red.

Details
- Origin: Posterior border of iliac crest
- Insertion: Inferior border of 12th rib and L1-L4
- Artery: Lumbar arteries, lumbar branch of iliolumbar artery
- Nerve: The twelfth thoracic and first through fourth ventral rami of lumbar nerves (T_{12}, L_{1}-L_{4})
- Actions: Alone (unilateral), lateral flexion of vertebral column; Together (bilateral), depression of thoracic rib cage

Identifiers
- Latin: musculus quadratus lumborum
- TA98: A04.5.01.027
- TA2: 2382
- FMA: 15569

The quadratus lumborum muscle, informally called the QL, is a paired muscle of the left and right posterior abdominal wall. It is the deepest abdominal muscle, and commonly referred to as a back muscle. Each muscle of the pair is an irregular quadrilateral in shape, hence the name.

The quadratus lumborum muscles originate from the wings of the ilium; their insertions are on the transverse processes of the upper four lumbar vertebrae plus the lower posterior border of the twelfth rib. Contraction of one of the pair of muscles causes lateral flexion of the lumbar spine, elevation of the pelvis, or both. Contraction of both causes extension of the lumbar spine.

A disorder of the quadratus lumborum muscles is pain due to muscle fatigue from constant contraction due to prolonged sitting, such as at a computer or in a car. Kyphosis and weak gluteal muscles can also contribute to the likelihood of quadratus lumborum pain.

== Structure ==
The quadratus lumborum muscle originates by aponeurotic fibers into the iliolumbar ligament and the internal lip of the iliac crest for about 5 centimetres (2.0 in). It inserts from the lower border of the last rib for about half its length and by four small tendons from the apices of the transverse processes of the upper four lumbar vertebrae.

The number of attachments to the vertebræ, and the extent of its attachment to the last rib, may vary. Also, occasionally, a second portion of this muscle is found in front of the preceding. It arises from the upper borders of the transverse processes of the lower three or four lumbar vertebræ, and is inserted into the lower margin of the last rib.

=== Relationships ===
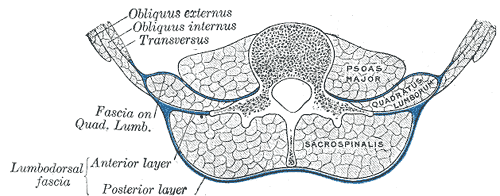
Cross-section of the posterior abdominal wall, showing on the right the relationship of the quadratus lumborum muscle to the psoas major and sacrospinalis muscles.

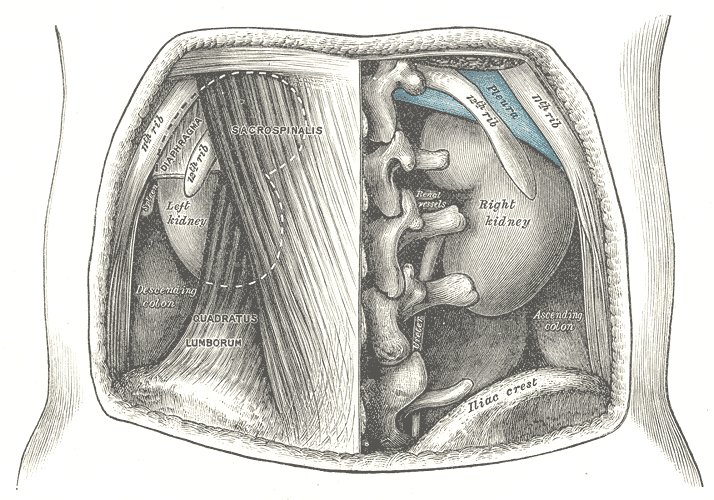
Posterior view showing on the left the relationship of the left kidney to the left quadratus lumborum muscle.

Anterior to the quadratus lumborum are the colon, the kidney, the psoas major muscle, (if present) the psoas minor muscle, and the diaphragm; between the fascia and the muscle are the twelfth thoracic, ilioinguinal, and iliohypogastric nerves. The quadratus lumborum muscle is a continuation of transverse abdominal muscle.

=== Nerve supply ===
Anterior branches of the ventral rami of T12 to L4.

== Functions ==
The quadratus lumborum can perform four actions:

1. Lateral flexion of vertebral column, with ipsilateral contraction
2. Extension of lumbar vertebral column, with bilateral contraction (based on line of force passing ~3.5 cm posterior L3 rotation axis)
3. Fixes the 12th rib during forced expiration. The quadratus lumborum assists the diaphragm in inhalation
4. Elevates the Ilium (bone), with ipsilateral contraction ("hip hiking")

Additional functions:

- Vertical stabilization of pelvis, lumbar spine, and lumbosacral junction. Prevents collapse of the vertebral column in the frontal plane (i.e. scoliosis)
- Reserve mover actions: anterior pelvic tilt.
- Contralateral lateral pelvic rotation.

== Clinical significance ==
The quadratus lumborum muscles can be the source of back pain when overused, or in association with scoliosis or weak gluteal muscles.

=== Mechanism ===
The quadratus lumborum is a common source of unilateral or bilateral lower back pain, including localized pain and tenderness over the wing of the ilium. Because quadratus lumborum connects the pelvis to the spine and is therefore capable of extending the lower back when contracting bilaterally, the two quadratus lumborum muscles pick up the slack, as it were, when the lower fibers of the erector spinae are weak or inhibited (as they often are in the case of habitual seated computer use and/or the use of a lower back support in a chair). Given their comparable mechanical disadvantage, constant contraction while seated can overuse the quadratus lumborum, resulting in muscle fatigue. A constantly contracted quadratus lumborum, like any other muscle, will experience decreased blood flow, and, in time, adhesions in the muscle and fascia may develop, the end point of which is muscle spasm.

=== Association with kyphosis ===
This chain of events can be and often is accelerated by kyphosis, which is invariably accompanied by rounded shoulders, both of which place greater stress on the quadratus lumborum by shifting body weight forward, forcing the erector spinae, quadratus lumborum, multifidi, and especially the levator scapulae to work harder in both seated and standing positions to maintain an erect torso and neck. The experience of "productive pain" or pleasure by a patient upon palpation of the quadratus lumborum is indicative of such a condition.

=== Association with weak gluteal muscles ===
Hip abduction is performed primarily by the hip abductors (gluteus medius and minimus). When the gluteus medius/minimus are weak or inhibited, the tensor fasciae latae or quadratus lumborum will compensate by becoming the prime mover. The most impaired movement pattern of hip abduction is when the quadratus lumborum initiates the movement, which results in hip hiking during swing phase of gait. Hip hiking places excessive side-bending compressive stresses on the lumbar segments. Thus, a tight quadratus lumborum may be another hidden cause of low back pain (Janda 1987).

When the hip adductors are tight or hypertonic, their antagonist (gluteus medius) may experience reciprocal inhibition. The gluteus medius will become weak and inhibited. This in turn may cause hypertonicity of ipsilateral quadratus lumborum. Chronic hypertonicity of quadratus lumborum tends to cause low back pain due to its ability to create compressive stress on lumbar segment.

=== Treatment ===
While stretching and strengthening the quadratus lumborum are indicated for unilateral lower back pain, heat or ice applications as well as massage should be considered as part of any comprehensive rehabilitation regimen.

Current studies show that application of heat or ice, massage, and estim will not leave long-term benefits. Careful assessment of muscular imbalances and movement impairments by a therapist is recommended in order to address the underlying issues mentioned.
