= Hypogastrium =

Region of the abdomen

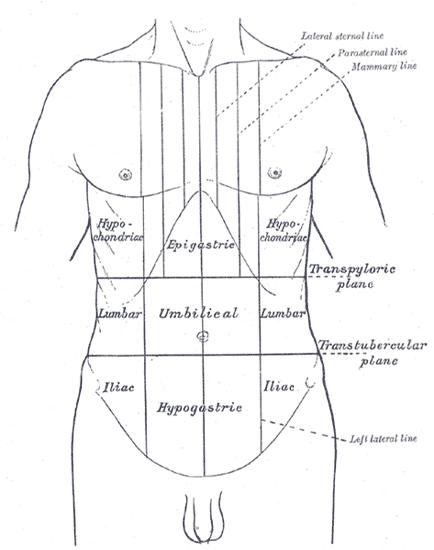
- Surface lines of the front of the thorax and abdomen.

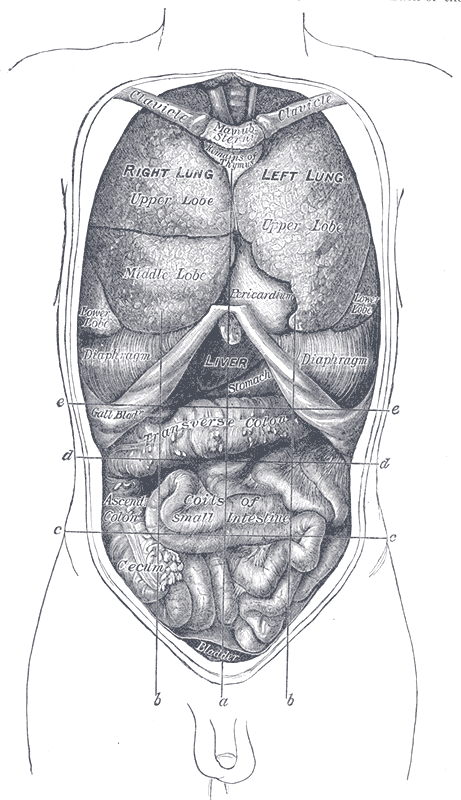
- Front view of the thoracic and abdominal viscera. a. Median plane. b b. Lateral planes. c c. Trans tuberculllar plane. d d. Subcostal plane. e e. Transpyloric plane.

Details

Identifiers
- Latin: regio hypogastrica, regio pubica
- TA98: A01.2.04.007
- TA2: 263
- FMA: 14602

The hypogastrium (also called the hypogastric region or suprapubic region) is a region of the abdomen located below the umbilical region.

== Etymology ==
The roots of the word hypogastrium mean "below the stomach"; the roots of suprapubic mean "above the pubic bone".

== Boundaries ==
The upper limit is the umbilicus while the pubis bone constitutes its lower limit. The lateral boundaries are formed by drawing straight lines through the midway between the anterior superior iliac spine and symphysis pubis.
