= Iliac crest =

Top border of the hip

- Pelvic girdle.

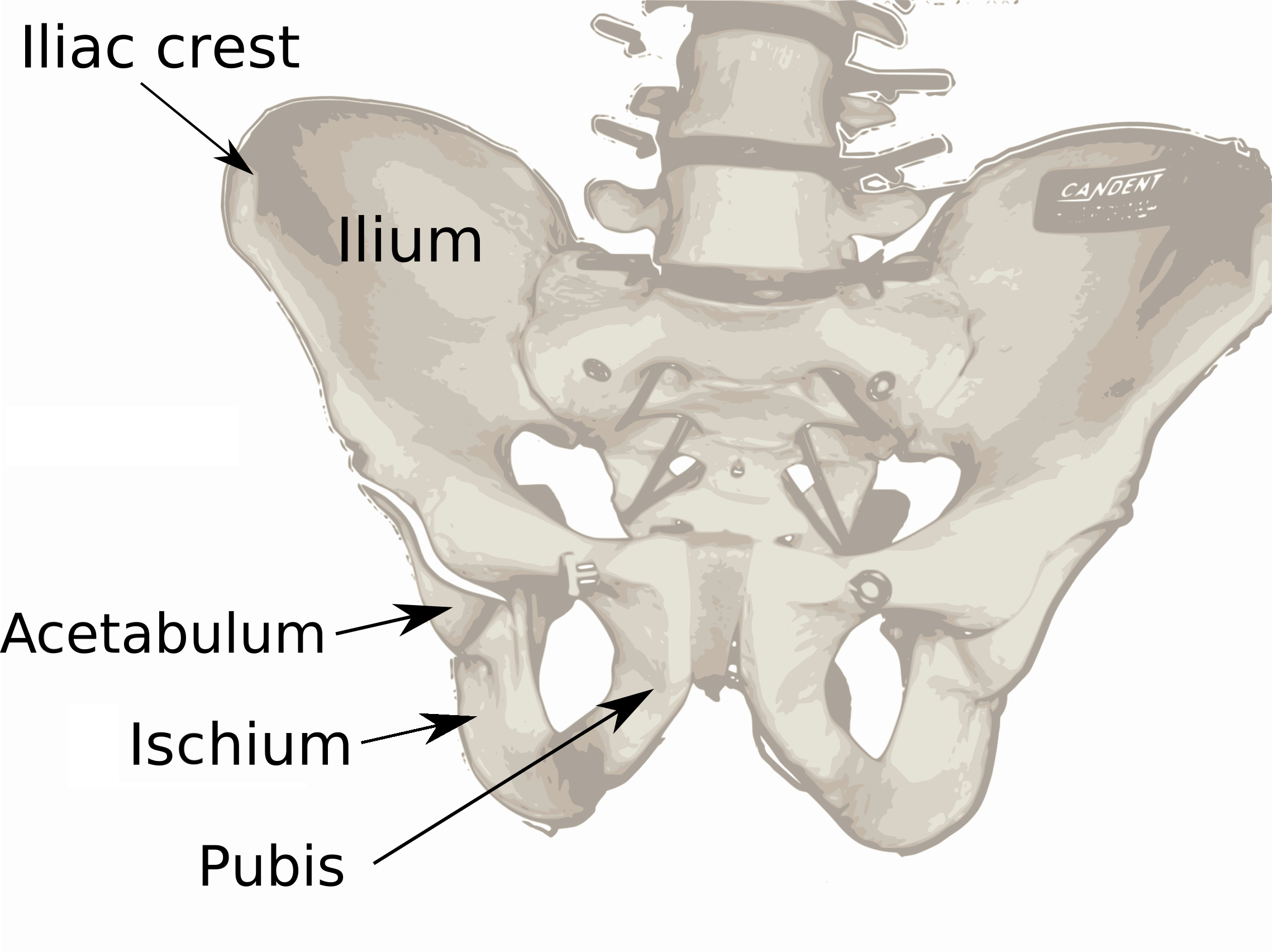
- Overview of Ilium as largest bone of the pelvis

Details

Identifiers
- Latin: crista iliaca
- TA98: A02.5.01.106
- TA2: 1322
- FMA: 16914

The crest of the ilium (or iliac crest) is the superior border of the wing of ilium and the superolateral margin of the greater pelvis.

== Structure ==
The iliac crest stretches posteriorly from the anterior superior iliac spine (ASIS) to the posterior superior iliac spine (PSIS). Behind the ASIS, it divides into an outer and inner lip separated by the intermediate zone. The outer lip bulges laterally into the iliac tubercle. Palpable in its entire length, the crest is convex superiorly but is sinuously curved, being concave inward in front, concave outward behind. It is sigmoid in shape, such that viewed from above, the left iliac crest resembles an outstretched S, while the right iliac crest forms its mirror image.

It is thinner at the center than at the extremities.

=== Development ===
The iliac crest is derived from endochondral bone.

== Function ==
The external lip are attached the Tensor fasciae latae, Obliquus externus abdominis, and Latissimus dorsi, and along its whole length the fascia lata; to the intermediate line, the Obliquus internus abdominis.

To the internal lip, the iliac fascia, the Transversus abdominis, Quadratus lumborum, Sacrospinalis, and Iliacus.

- Abdominal external oblique muscle
- Abdominal internal oblique muscle
- Transversus abdominis muscle
- Quadratus lumborum muscle
- Erector spinae
  - Iliocostalis pars lumborum
  - Longissimus pars thoracis
- Latissimus dorsi
- Tensor fasciae latae
- Iliacus muscle
- Fascia lata
- Iliac fascia
- Transverse fascia

== Clinical significance ==
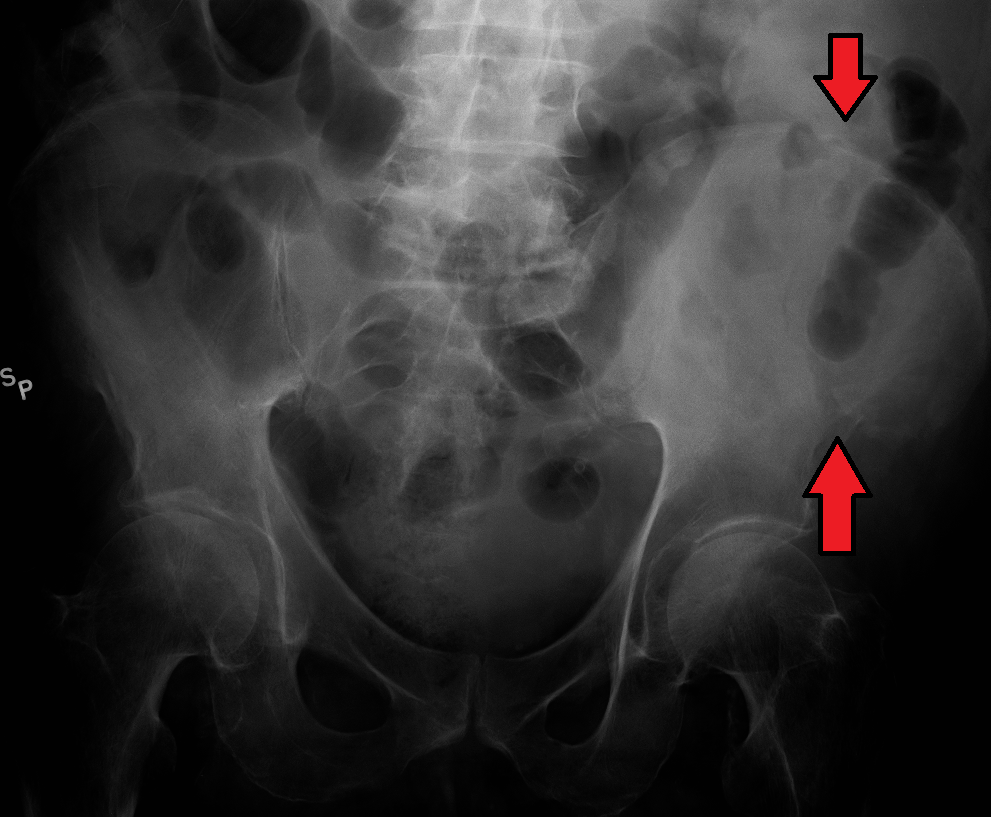
A fracture of the left iliac wing

The iliac crest has a large amount of red bone marrow, and thus it is the site of bone marrow harvests (from both sides) to collect the stem cells used in bone marrow transplantation. The iliac crest is also considered the best donor site for bone grafting when a large quantity of bone is needed. For example, oral and maxillofacial surgeons will often use iliac crest bone to fill in large osseous defects of the oral cavity caused by severe periodontal disease, excess bone resorption following tooth loss, trauma, or congenital defects including alveolar clefts.

The top of the iliac crests also marks the level of the fourth lumbar vertebral body (L4), above or below which lumbar puncture may be performed. Furthermore, said level is often referred to as the "intercristal line".

== Additional images ==
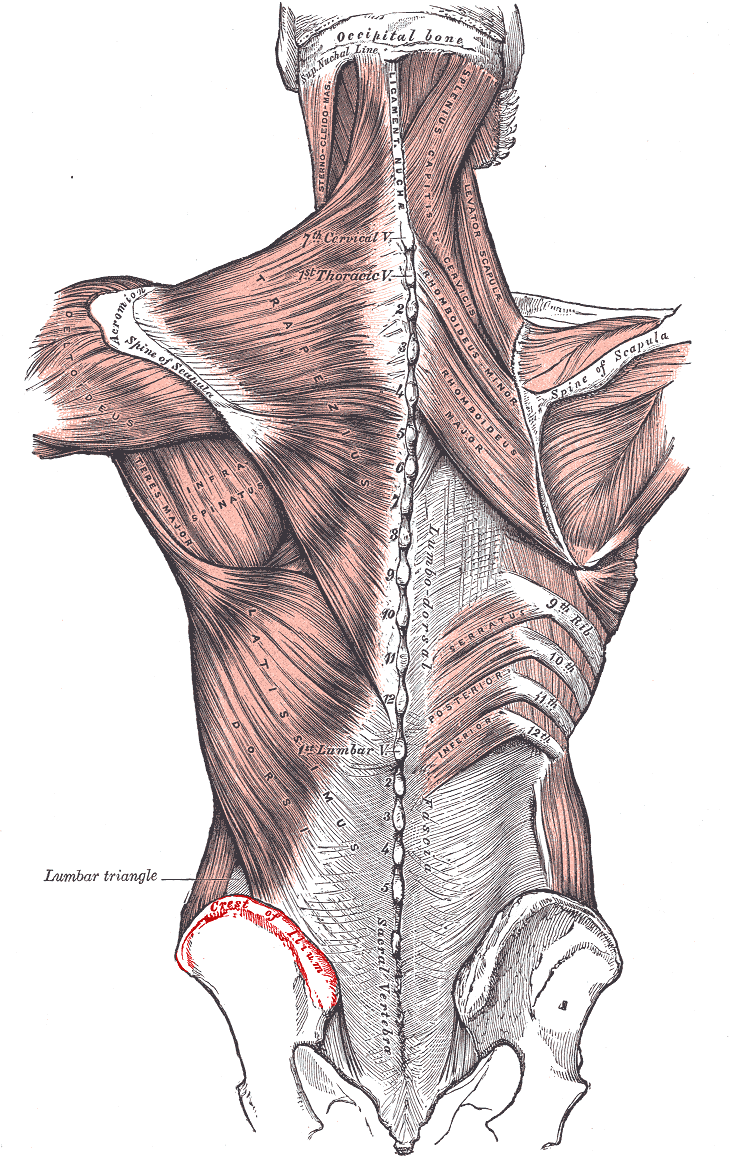
Muscles connecting the upper extremity to the vertebral column. Left iliac crest is labeled in red.

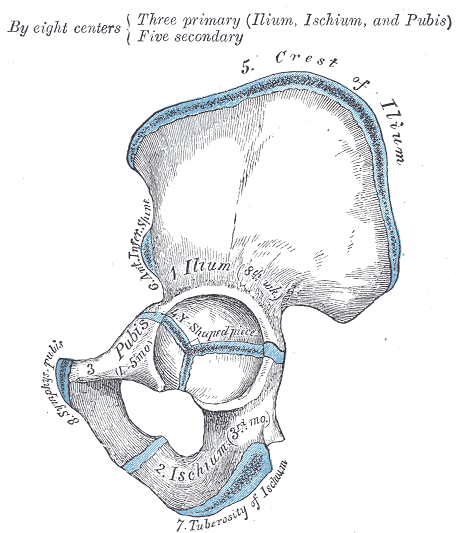
Plan of ossification of the hip bone

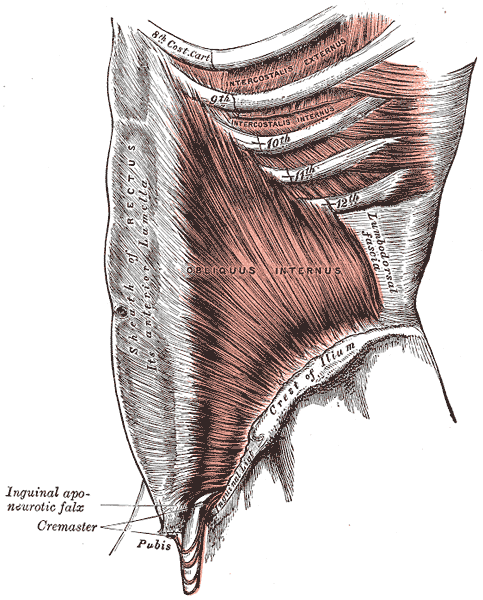
The Obliquus internus abdominis

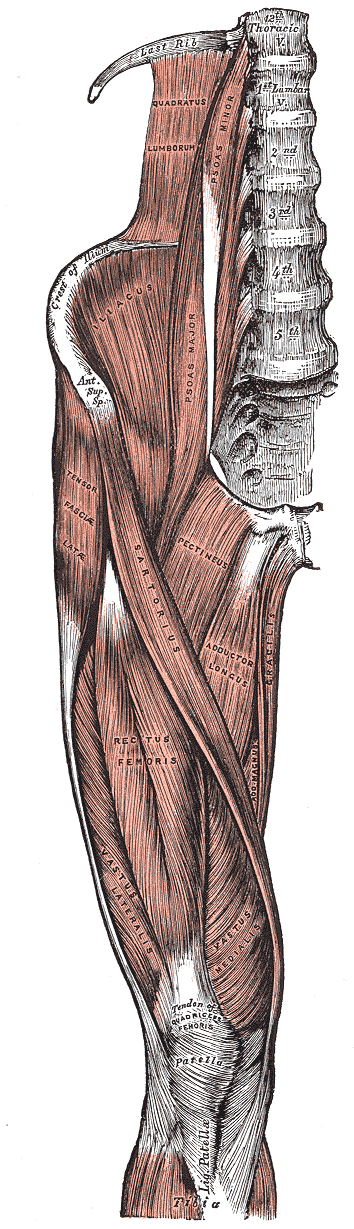
Muscles of the iliac and anterior femoral regions

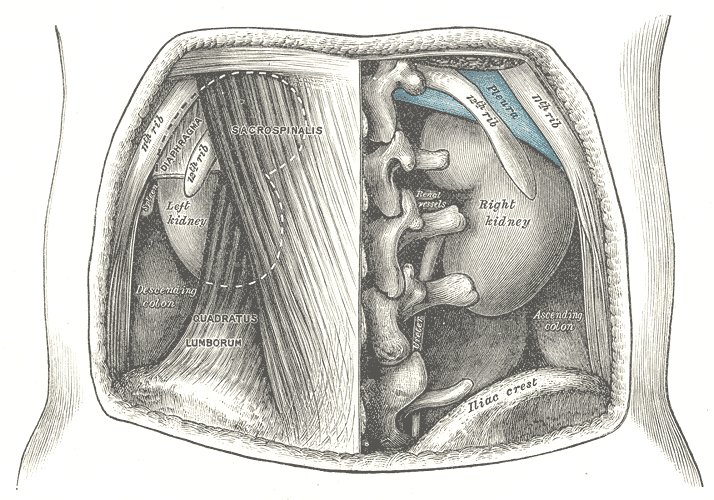
The relations of the kidneys from behind

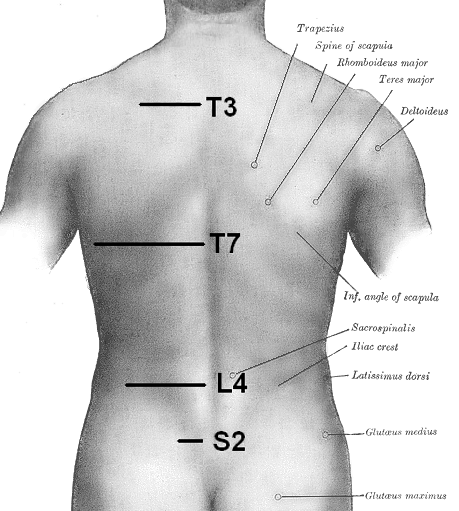
Iliac crest labeled at center right

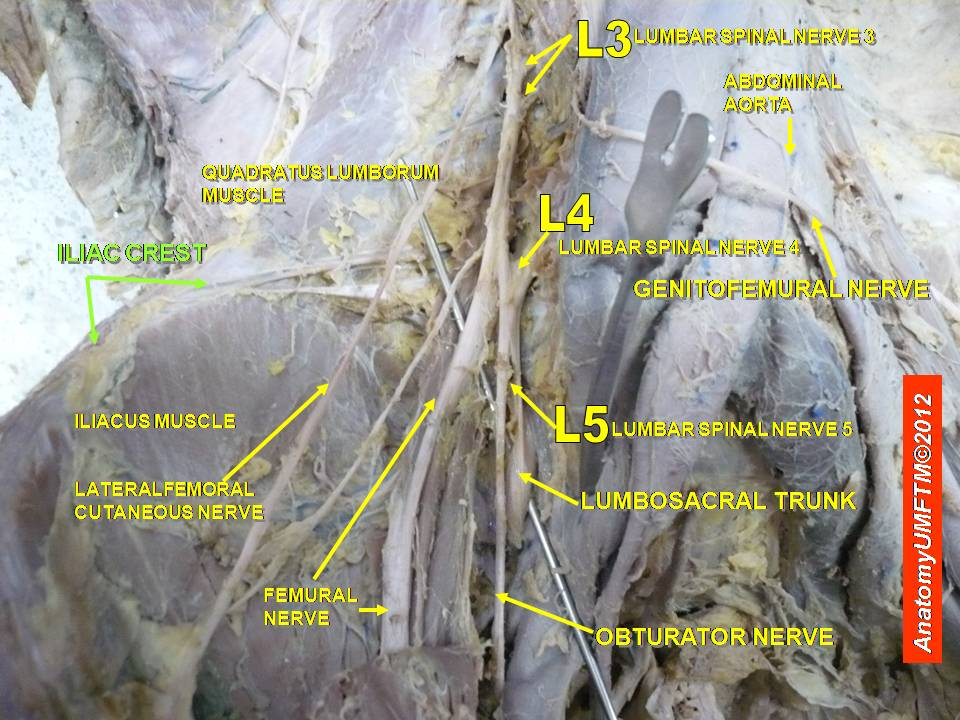
Iliac crest

== See also ==
- Apollo's belt
- Hip pointer
