= Psoas major muscle =

Long fusiform muscle located in the lumbar region

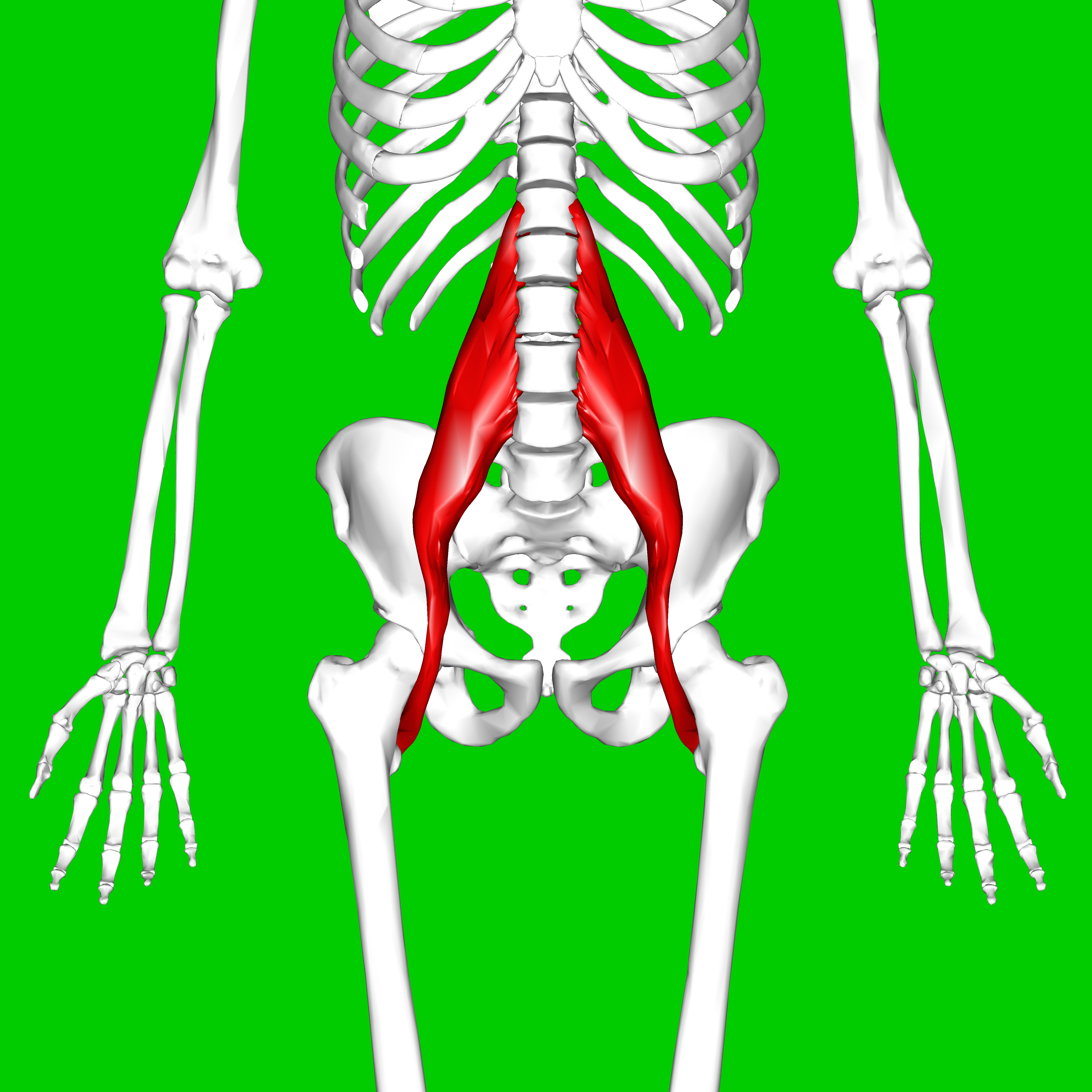
- Position of psoas major (shown in red)

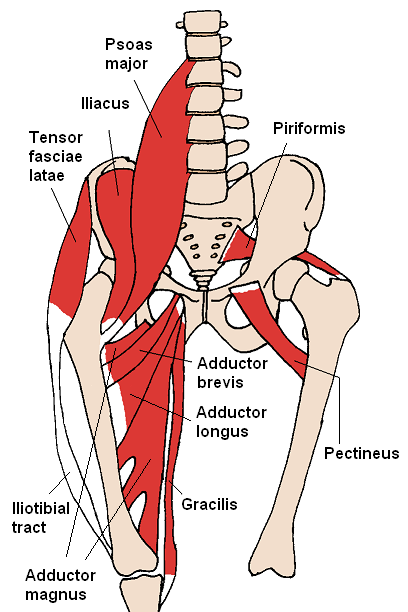
- The psoas major and nearby muscles

Details
- Origin: Transverse processes of T12–L4 and the lateral aspects of the discs between them
- Insertion: In the lesser trochanter of the femur
- Artery: lumbar branch of iliolumbar artery
- Nerve: Lumbar plexus via anterior branches of L1–L3 nerves
- Actions: Flexion in the hip joint
- Antagonist: Gluteus maximus

Identifiers
- Latin: musculus psoas major
- TA98: A04.7.02.004
- TA2: 2595
- FMA: 18060

The psoas major (/ˈsoʊ.əs/ or /ˈsoʊ.æs/; from Ancient Greek: ψόᾱ, romanized: psóā, lit. 'muscles of the loins') is a long fusiform muscle located in the lateral lumbar region between the vertebral column and the brim of the lesser pelvis. It joins the iliacus muscle to form the iliopsoas. In other animals, this muscle is equivalent to the tenderloin.

== Structure ==
The psoas major is divided into a superficial and a deep part. The deep part originates from the transverse processes of lumbar vertebrae L1–L5. The superficial part originates from the lateral surfaces of the last thoracic vertebra, lumbar vertebrae L1–L4, and the neighboring intervertebral discs. The lumbar plexus lies between the two layers.

Together, the iliacus muscle and the psoas major form the iliopsoas, which is surrounded by the iliac fascia. The iliopsoas runs across the iliopubic eminence through the muscular lacuna to its insertion on the lesser trochanter of the femur. The iliopectineal bursa separates the tendon of the iliopsoas muscle from the external surface of the hip-joint capsule at the level of the iliopubic eminence. The iliac subtendinous bursa lies between the lesser trochanter and the attachment of the iliopsoas.

=== Nerve supply ===
Innervation of the psoas major is through the anterior rami of L1 to L3 nerves.

=== Variation ===
In fewer than 50 percent of human subjects, the psoas major is accompanied by the psoas minor muscle.

One study using autopsy data found that the psoas major muscle is substantially thicker in black men than in white men, and that the occurrence of the psoas minor is also ethnically variant, being present in most of the white subjects and absent in most of the black subjects.

In mice, it is mostly a fast-twitching, type II muscle, while in humans it combines slow- and fast-twitching fibers.

== Function ==
The psoas major joins the upper body and the lower body, the axial to the appendicular skeleton, the inside to the outside, and the back to the front. As part of the iliopsoas, psoas major contributes to flexion in the hip joint. On the lumbar spine, unilateral contraction bends the trunk laterally, while bilateral contraction raises the trunk from its supine position. In addition, attachment to the lesser trochanter, located on the posteromedial aspect of the femur, causes lateral rotation and weak adduction of the hip.

It forms part of a group of muscles called the hip flexors, whose action is primarily to lift the upper leg towards the body when the body is fixed or to pull the body towards the leg when the leg is fixed.

For example, when one performs a sit-up that brings the torso (including the lower back) away from the ground and towards the front of the leg, the hip flexors (including the iliopsoas) will flex the spine upon the pelvis.

Owing to the frontal attachment on the vertebrae, rotation of the spine will stretch the psoas.

== Clinical significance ==
Tightness of the psoas can result in spasms or lower-back pain by compressing the lumbar discs. Alternatively inflammation or compression of the lumbar nerve roots from disc disease can present as psoas pain. A hypertonic and inflamed psoas can lead to irritation and entrapment of the ilioinguinal and the iliohypogastric nerves, resulting in a sensation of heat or water running down the front of the thigh.

Psoas can be palpated with active flexion of the hip. A positive psoas contracture test and pain with palpation reported by the patient indicate clinical significance. Care should be taken around the abdominal organs, especially the colon when palpating deeply.

The appearance of a protruding belly can visually indicate a hypertonic psoas, which pulls the spine forward while pushing the abdominal contents outward.

The psoas lies posterolateral to the lumbar sympathetic ganglia, and when a lumbar sympathetic block is administered the needle tip will often pass through the psoas major.

The genitofemoral nerve is formed in the midsection of the psoas muscle by the union of branches from the anterior rami of L1 and L2 nerve roots. The nerve then courses inferiorly within the psoas muscle and finally "pierces" the muscle and emerges on the anterior surface of the psoas distally. The nerve then traverses the retroperitoneum, descending over the anterior surface of the psoas.

== See also ==
- Iliopsoas
- Iliacus
- Hip flexor
- Psoas minor muscle
- Iliopsoas tendinitis
- Tenderloin
- Tension and Trauma Releasing Exercises (TRE), a stress-reduction method utilizing targeted activation of the psoas muscle

== Additional images ==
Position of psoas major muscle. Animation. Hip bones are shown in semi-transparent.

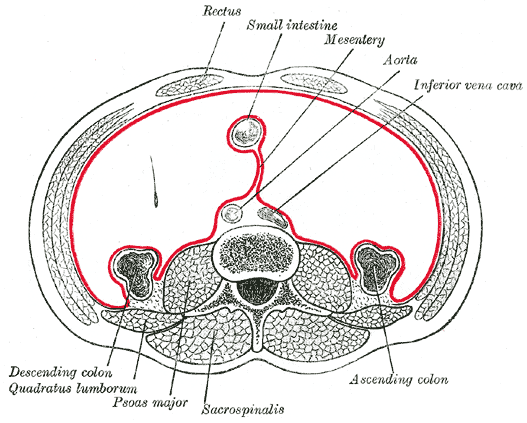
Horizontal disposition of the peritoneum in the lower part of the abdomen. Psoas major labeled at bottom left.

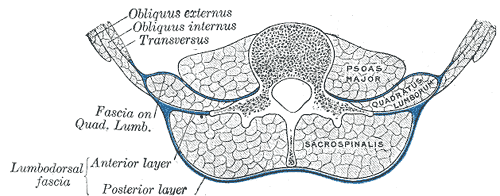
Diagram of a transverse section of the posterior abdominal wall, to show the disposition of the lumbodorsal fascia.

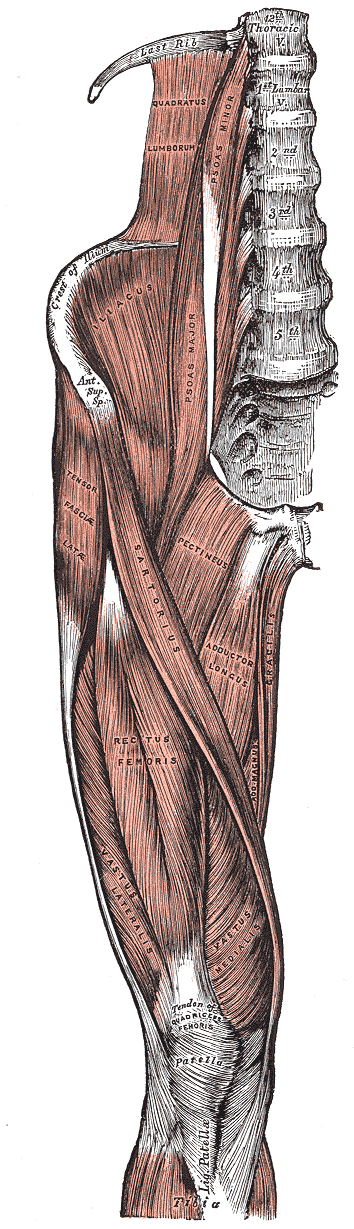
Muscles of the iliac and anterior femoral regions.

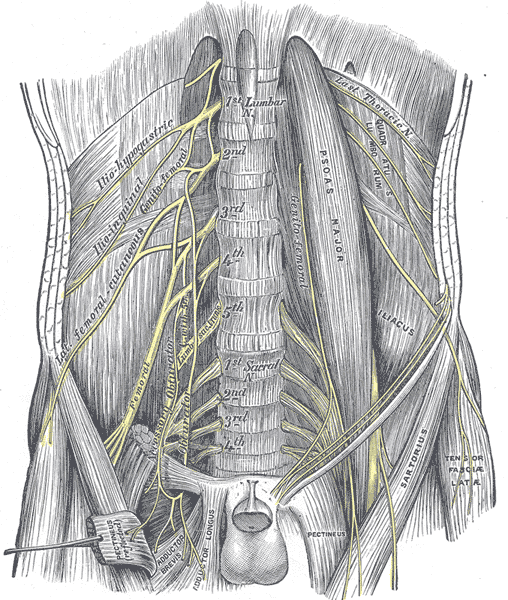
The lumbar plexus and its branches.

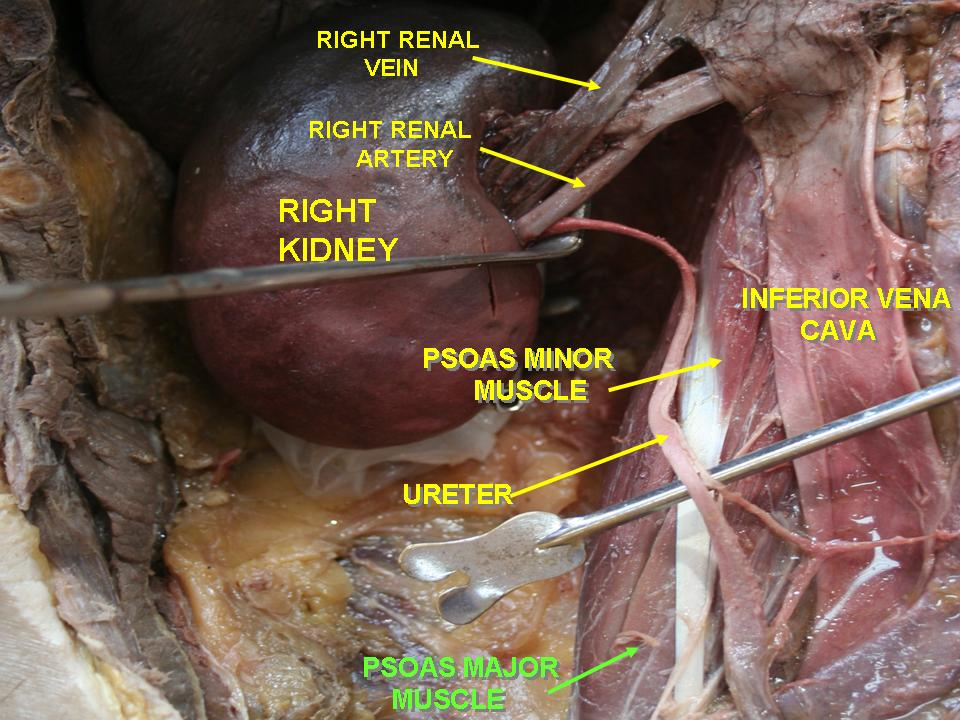
Psoas major muscle

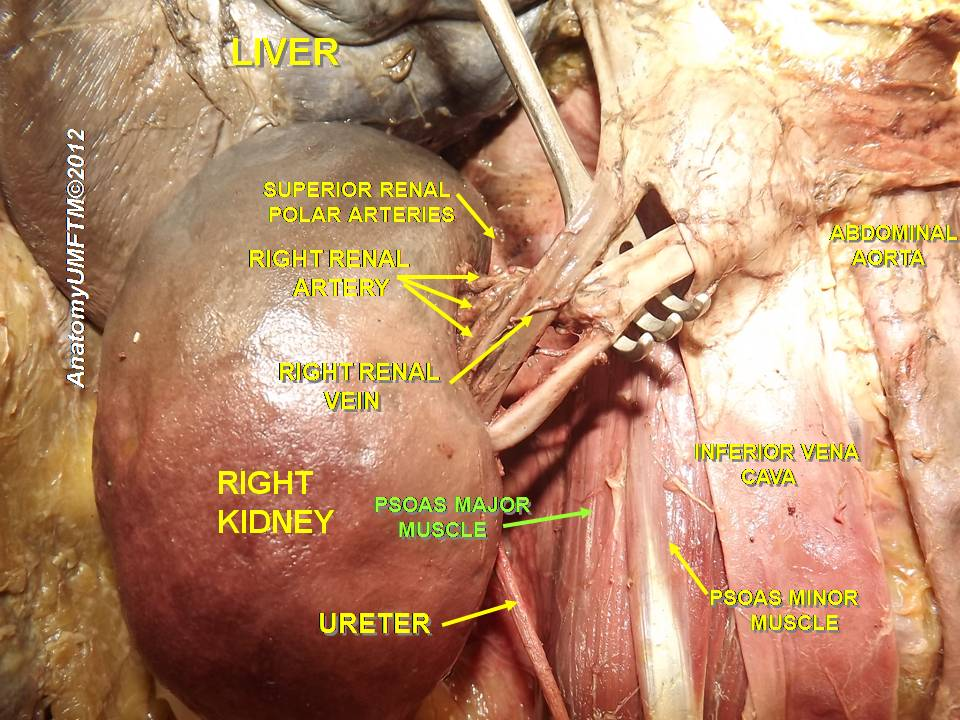
Psoas major muscle
