= Abdominal external oblique muscle =

Skeletal muscle in the abdomen

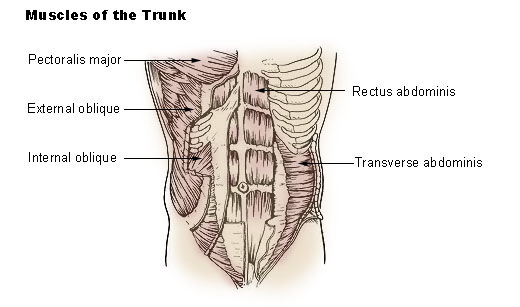
- Muscles of the trunk.

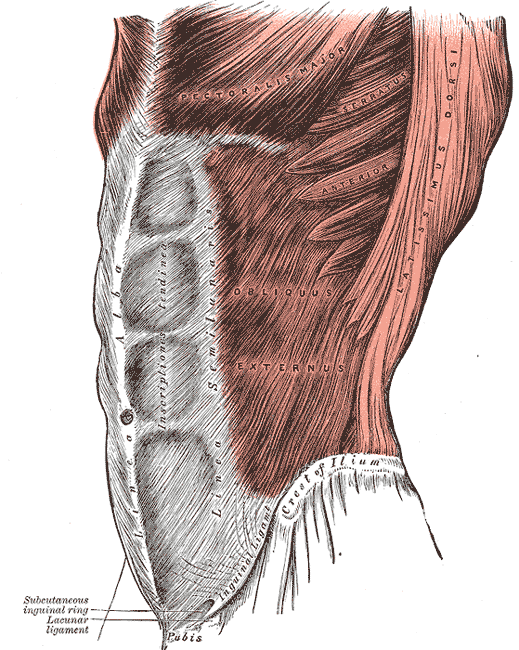
- The abdominal external oblique muscle

Details
- Origin: Ribs 5-12,
- Insertion: Xiphoid process,outer lip of the iliac crest, pubic crest, pubic tubercle, linea alba, inguinal ligament, anterior superior iliac spine (ASIS)
- Nerve: Thoraco-abdominal nerves (T7-11) and subcostal nerve (T12)
- Actions: Flexion of the torso and contralateral rotation of torso

Identifiers
- Latin: musculus obliquus externus abdominis
- TA98: A04.5.01.008
- TA2: 2364
- FMA: 13335

The abdominal external oblique muscle (also external oblique muscle or exterior oblique or musculus obliquus abdominis externus) is the largest and outermost of the three flat abdominal muscles of the lateral anterior abdomen.

== Structure ==
The external oblique is situated on the lateral and anterior parts of the abdomen. It is broad, thin, and irregularly quadrilateral, its muscular portion occupying the side, its aponeurosis the anterior wall of the abdomen. In most humans, the oblique is not visible, due to subcutaneous fat deposits and the small size of the muscle.

It arises from eight fleshy digitations, each from the external surfaces and inferior borders of the fifth to twelfth ribs (lower eight ribs). These digitations are arranged in an oblique line which runs inferiorly and anteriorly, with the upper digitations being attached close to the cartilages of the corresponding ribs, the lowest to the apex of the cartilage of the last rib, the intermediate ones to the ribs at some distance from their cartilages.

The five superior serrations increase in size from above downward, and are received between corresponding processes of the serratus anterior muscle; the three lower ones diminish in size from above downward and receive between them corresponding processes from the latissimus dorsi. From these attachments the fleshy fibers proceed in various directions. Its posterior fibers from the ribs to the iliac crest form a free posterior border.

Those from the lowest ribs pass nearly vertically downward, and are inserted into the anterior half of the outer lip of the iliac crest; the middle and upper fibers, directed downward (inferiorly) and forward (anteriorly), become aponeurotic at approximately the midclavicular line and form the anterior layer of the rectus sheath. This aponeurosis formed from fibres from either side of the external oblique decussates at the linea alba.

The aponeurosis of the external oblique muscle forms the inguinal ligament. The muscle also contributes to the inguinal canal.

The internal oblique muscle is just deep to the external oblique muscle.

=== Nerve supply ===
The external oblique muscle is supplied by ventral branches of the lower six thoracoabdominal nerves and the subcostal nerve on each side.

=== Blood supply ===
The cranial portion of the muscle is supplied by the lower intercostal arteries, whereas the caudal portion is supplied by a branches of either the deep circumflex iliac artery or the iliolumbar artery.

== Function ==
The external oblique functions to pull the chest downwards and compress the abdominal cavity, which increases the intra-abdominal pressure as in a Valsalva maneuver. It also performs ipsilateral (same side) side-bending and contralateral (opposite side) rotation: the right external oblique would side-bend to the right and rotate to the left, and vice versa. The internal oblique muscle functions similarly except it rotates ipsilaterally.

== Society and culture ==
=== Oblique strain ===
The oblique strain is a common baseball injury, particularly in pitchers. In both batters and pitchers it can affect the contralateral (leading) side external oblique, or the trailing internal oblique.

=== Training ===
- Side plank

== Additional images ==
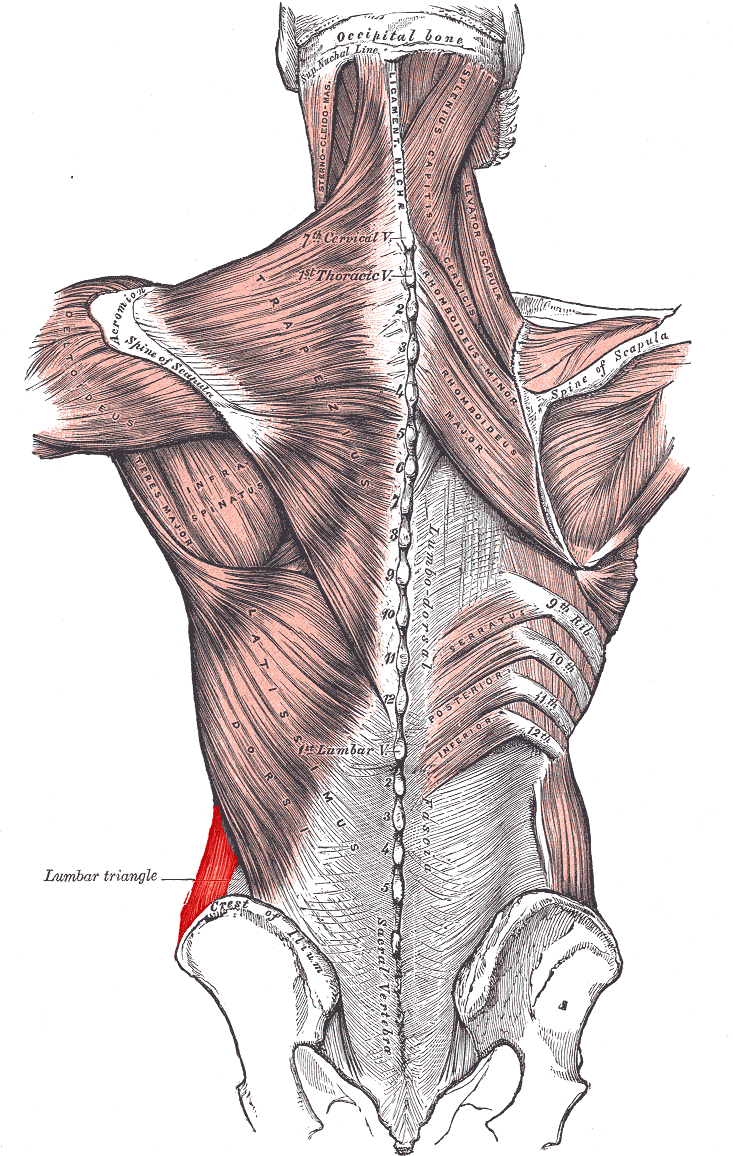
Posterior view of muscles connecting the upper extremity to the vertebral column. Posterior part of abdominal external oblique muscle labeled.

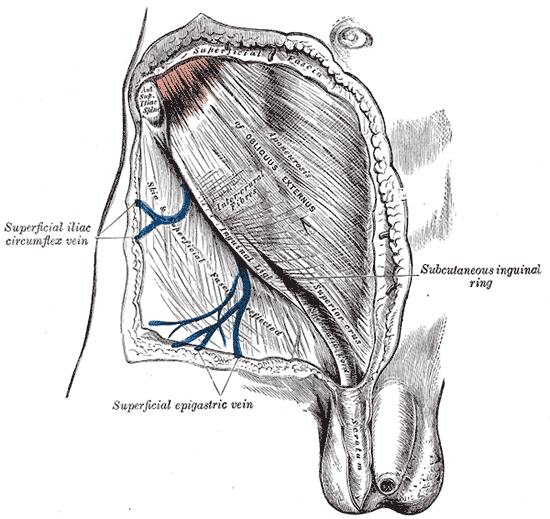
The subcutaneous inguinal ring.

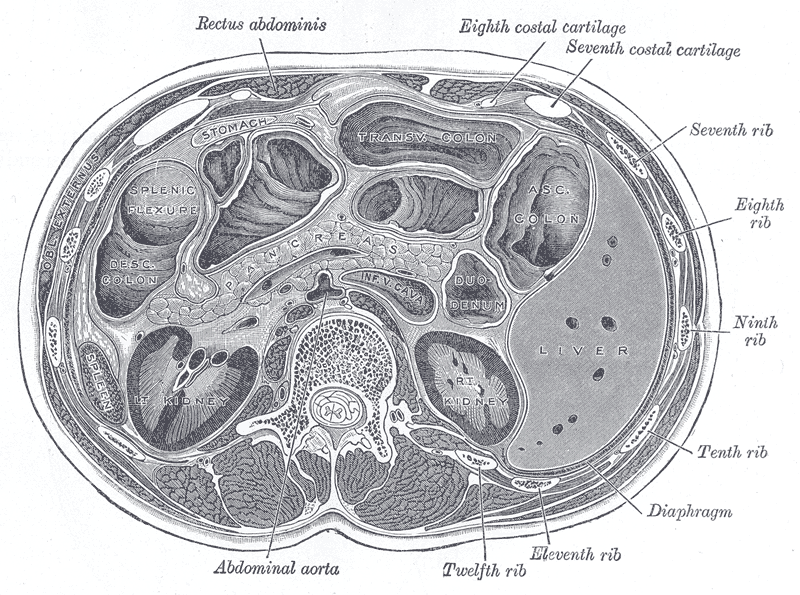
Transverse section through the middle of the first lumbar vertebra, showing the relations of the pancreas.

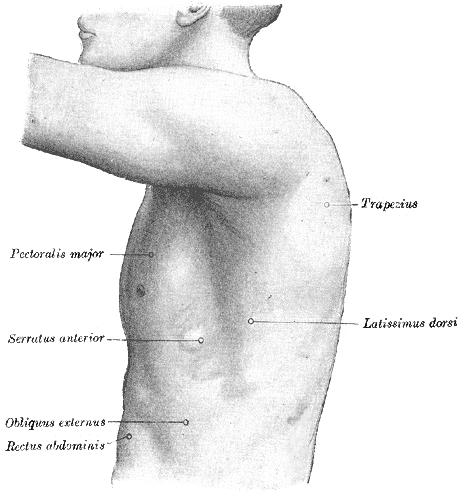
The left side of the thorax.

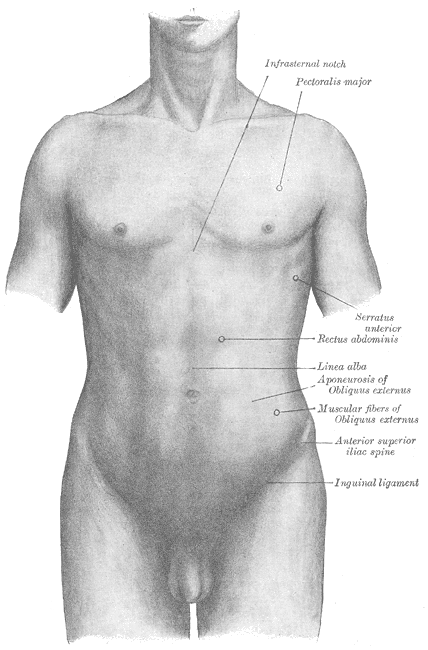
Surface anatomy of the front of the thorax and abdomen.

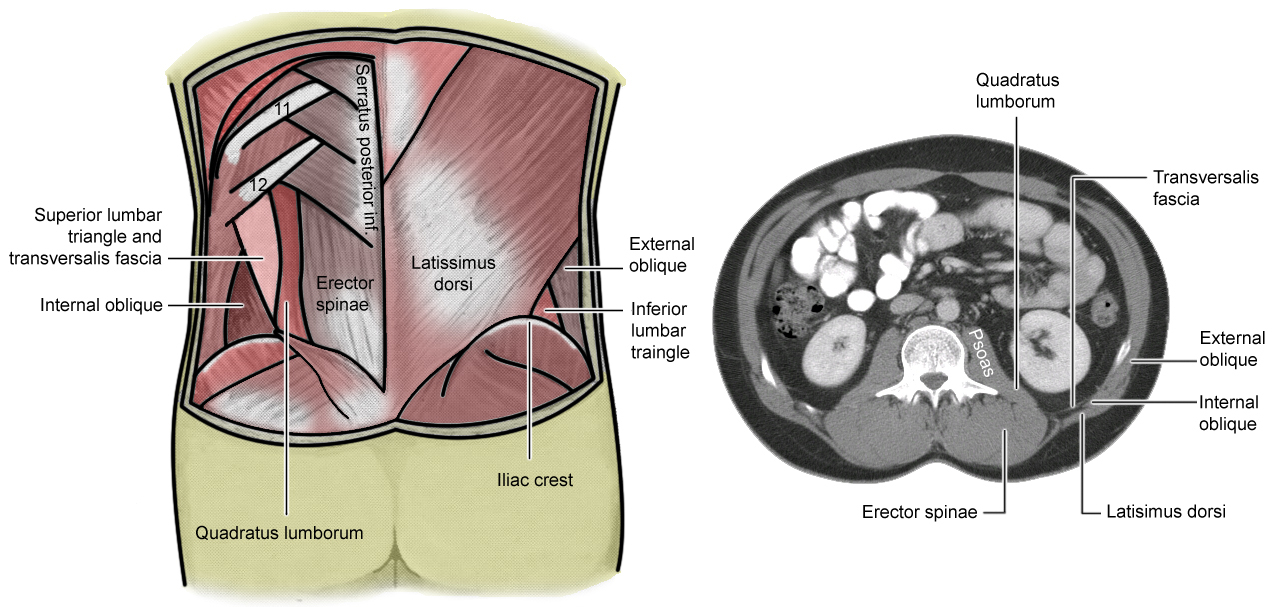
Lumbar triangle

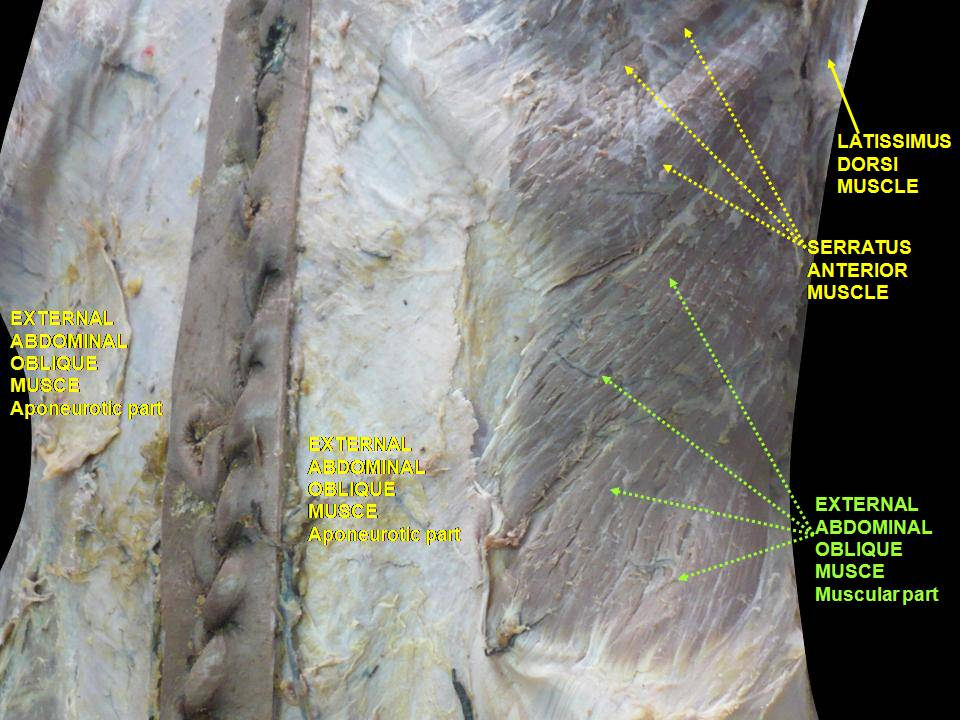
External abdominal oblique muscle. Anterior abdominal wall. Deep dissection. Anterior view.
