= Abdominal internal oblique muscle =

Muscle in the abdominal wall

Internal abdominal oblique muscle
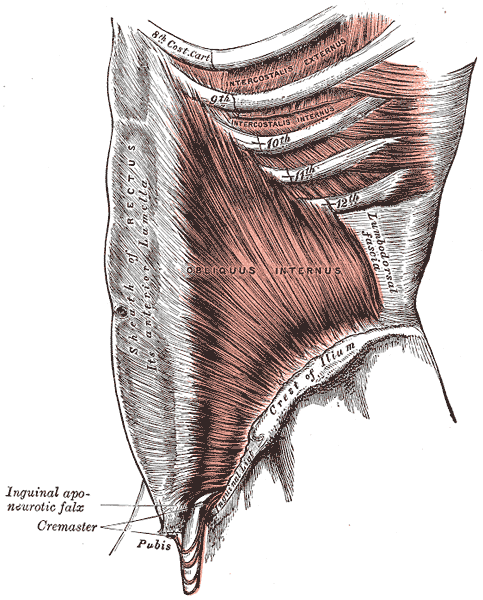
- The internal abdominal oblique muscle.

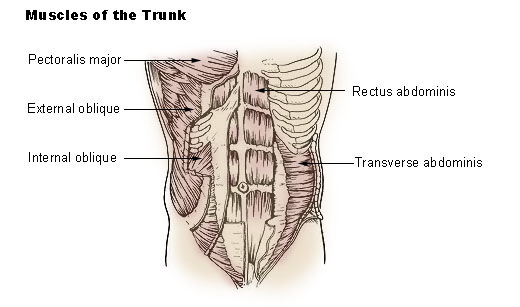
- Muscles of the trunk.

Details
- Origin: Inguinal ligament, iliac crest and the lumbodorsal fascia
- Insertion: Linea alba, pectineal line of pubis (via conjoint tendon) and ribs 10-12.
- Artery: Subcostal arteries
- Nerve: Thoracoabdominal nn. (T7-T11), subcostal n. (T12), iliohypogastric n. (L1) and ilioinguinal n. (L1)
- Actions: Bilateral: Compresses abdomen Unilateral: Ipsilateral trunk rotation

Identifiers
- Latin: musculus obliquus internus abdominis
- TA98: A04.5.01.017
- TA2: 2373
- FMA: 13891

The internal abdominal oblique muscle, also internal oblique muscle or interior oblique or musculus obliquus abdominis internus, is an abdominal muscle in the abdominal wall that lies below the external abdominal oblique muscle and just above the transversus abdominis muscle.

== Structure ==
Its fibers run perpendicular to the external oblique muscle, beginning in the thoracolumbar fascia of the lower back, the anterior 2/3 of the iliac crest (upper part of hip bone) and the lateral half of the inguinal ligament. The muscle fibers run from these points superomedially (up and towards midline) to the muscle's insertions on the inferior borders of the 10th through 12th ribs and the linea alba.

In males, the cremaster muscle is also attached to the internal oblique.

=== Nerve supply ===
The internal oblique is supplied by the lower intercostal nerves, as well as the iliohypogastric nerve and the ilioinguinal nerve.

== Function ==
The internal oblique performs two major functions. Firstly as an accessory muscle of respiration, it acts as an antagonist (opponent) to the diaphragm, helping to reduce the volume of the chest cavity during exhalation. When the diaphragm contracts, it pulls the lower wall of the chest cavity down, increasing the volume of the lungs which then fill with air. Conversely, when the internal obliques contract they compress the organs of the abdomen, pushing them up into the diaphragm which intrudes back into the chest cavity reducing the volume of the air-filled lungs, producing an exhalation.

Secondly, its contraction causes ipsilateral rotation and side-bending. It acts with the external oblique muscle of the opposite side to achieve this torsional movement of the trunk. For example, the right internal oblique and the left external oblique contract as the torso flexes and rotates to bring the left shoulder towards the right hip. For this reason, the internal obliques are referred to as "same-side rotators."

== Additional images ==
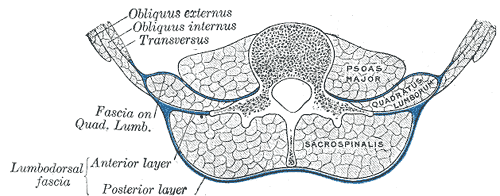
Diagram of a transverse section of the posterior abdominal wall, to show the disposition of the lumbodorsal fascia.

Diagram of sheath of Rectus.

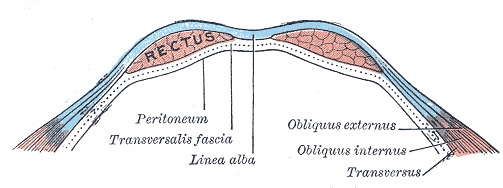
Diagram of a transverse section through the anterior abdomina wall, below the linea semicircularis.

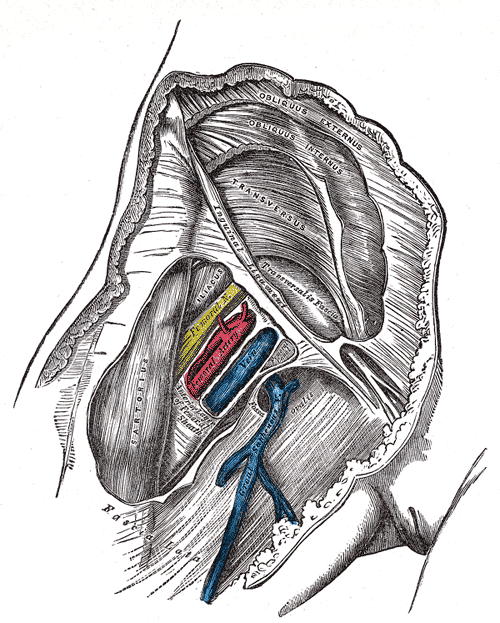
Femoral sheath laid open to show its three compartments.

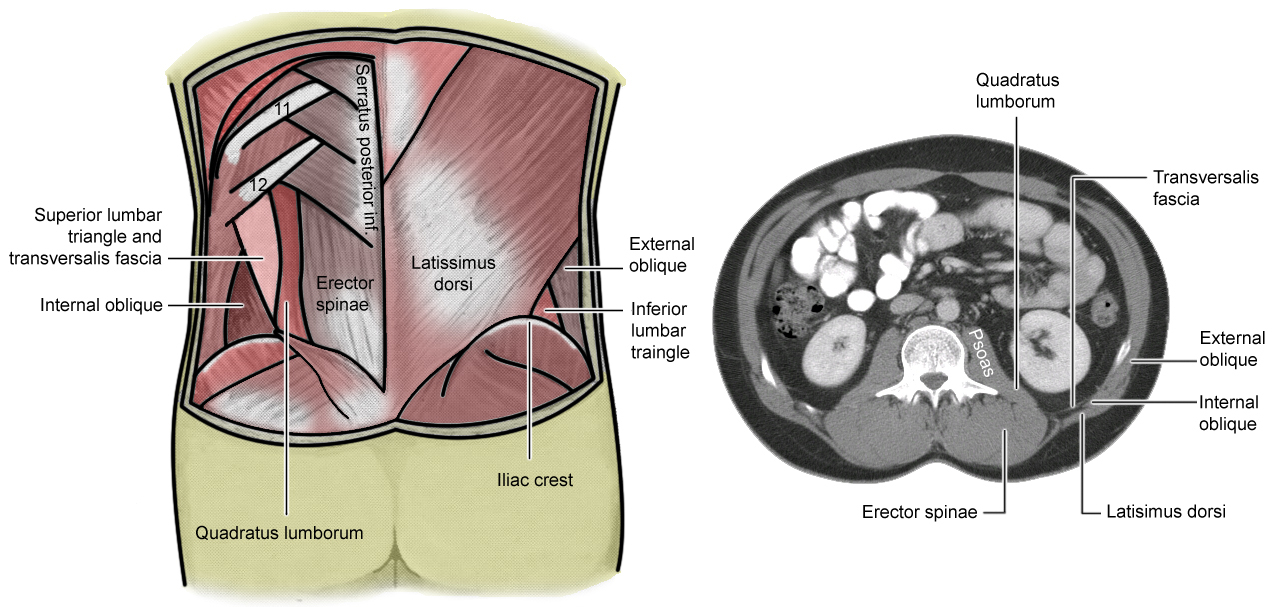
Lumbar triangle

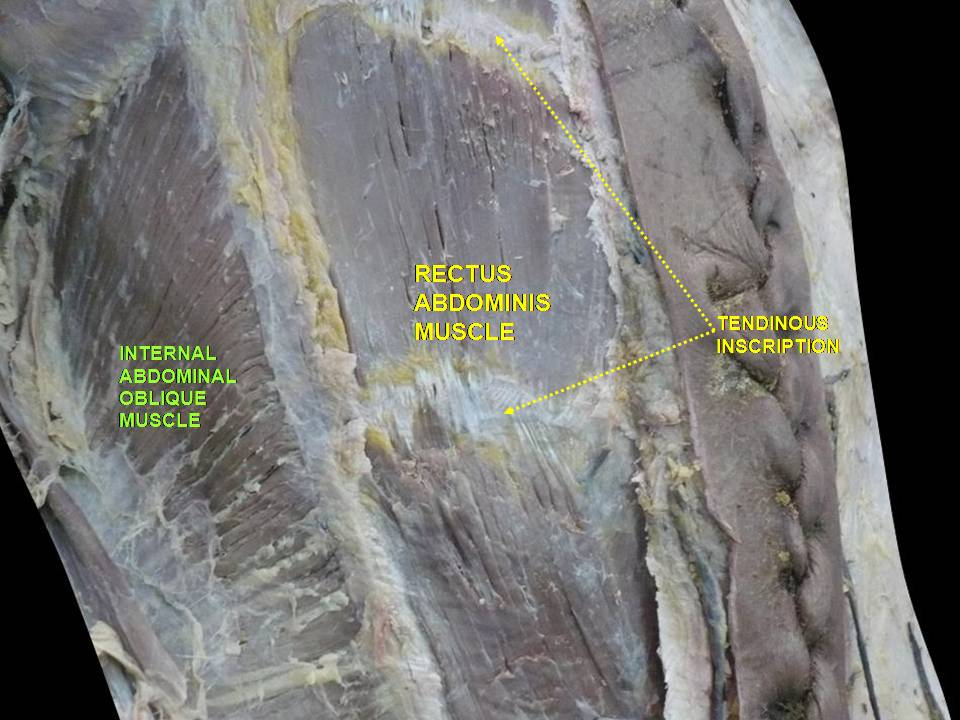
Internal abdominal oblique muscle.Anterior abdominal wall.Deep dissection.Anterior view

== See also ==
- Abdominal exercise
- Apollo's belt
