= Transverse abdominal muscle =

Muscle of the abdominal area

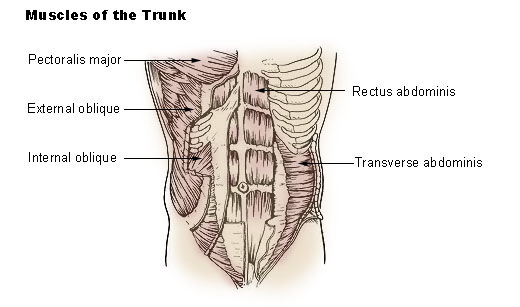
- Muscles of the trunk

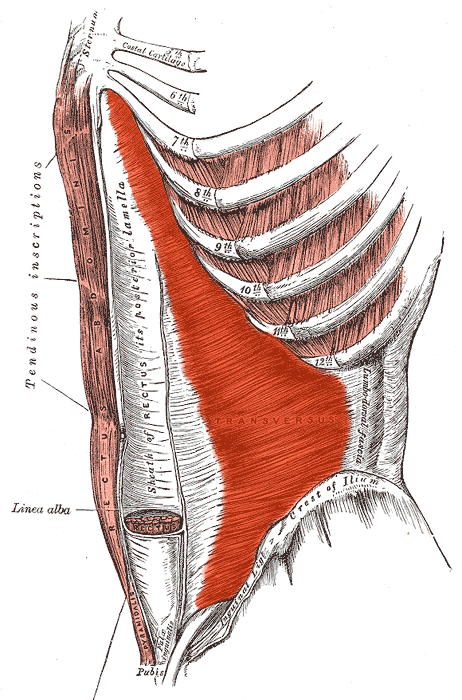
- The transversus abdominis, rectus abdominis, and pyramidalis

Details
- Origin: Iliac crest, inguinal ligament, thoracolumbar fascia, and costal cartilages 7-12
- Insertion: Xiphoid process, linea alba, pubic crest and pecten pubis via conjoint tendon
- Artery: Subcostal arteries
- Nerve: Thoracoabdominal nn. (T6-T11), Subcostal n. (T12), iliohypogastric nerve (L1), and ilioinguinal nerve (L1)
- Actions: Compresses abdominal contents (bilateral), rotates trunk ipsilaterally (unilateral)

Identifiers
- Latin: musculus transversus abdominis
- TA98: A04.5.01.019
- TA2: 2375
- FMA: 15570

The transverse abdominal muscle (TVA), also known as the transverse abdominis, transversalis muscle and transversus abdominis muscle, is a muscle layer of the anterior and lateral (front and side) abdominal wall, deep to (layered below) the internal oblique muscle. It serves to compress and retain the contents of the abdomen as well as assist in exhalation.

== Structure ==
The transverse abdominal, so called for the direction of its fibers, is the innermost of the flat muscles of the abdomen. It is positioned immediately deep to the internal oblique muscle.

The transverse abdominal arises as fleshy fibers, from the lateral third of the inguinal ligament, from the anterior three-fourths of the inner lip of the iliac crest, from the inner surfaces of the cartilages of the lower six ribs, interdigitating with the diaphragm, and from the thoracolumbar fascia. It ends anteriorly in a broad aponeurosis (the Spigelian fascia), the lower fibers of which curve inferomedially (medially and downward), and are inserted, together with those of the internal oblique muscle, into the crest of the pubis and pectineal line, forming the inguinal conjoint tendon also called the aponeurotic falx. In layperson's terms, the muscle ends in the middle line of a person's abdomen.

Throughout the rest of its extent the aponeurosis passes horizontally to the middle line, and is inserted into the linea alba; its upper three-fourths lie behind the rectus muscle and blend with the posterior lamella of the aponeurosis of the internal oblique; its lower fourth is in front of the rectus abdominis.

=== Innervation ===
The transverse abdominal is innervated by the lower intercostal nerves (thoracoabdominal, nerve roots T7-T11), as well as the iliohypogastric nerve and the ilioinguinal nerve.

== Function ==
The transverse abdominal helps to compress the ribs and viscera, providing thoracic and pelvic stability. It can contract during the exhalation phase of respiration to force air out of the thorax. The transverse abdominal also helps a pregnant person to deliver a child.

Without a stable spine, one aided by proper contraction of the TVA, the nervous system fails to recruit the muscles in the extremities efficiently, and functional movements cannot be properly performed. The transverse abdominal and the segmental stabilizers (e.g. the multifidi) of the spine have evolved to work in tandem.

It is true that the TVA is vital to back and core health, the muscle also has the effect of pulling in what would otherwise be a protruding abdomen (hence its nickname, the "corset muscle"). Training the rectus abdominis muscles alone will not and can not give one a "flat" belly; this effect is achieved only through training the TVA. Thus, to the extent that traditional abdominal exercises (e.g. crunches) or more advanced abdominal exercises tend to "flatten" the belly, this is owed to the tangential training of the TVA inherent in such exercises. Recently, the transverse abdominal has become the subject of debate between biokineticists, kinesiologists, strength trainers, and physical therapists. The two positions on the muscle are (1) that the muscle is effective and capable of bracing the human core during extremely heavy lifts and (2) that it is not. Specifically, one recent systematic review has found that the baseline dysfunction of TVA cannot predict the clinical outcomes of low back pain. Similarly, another systematic review has revealed that the changes in TVA function or morphology after different nonsurgical treatments are unrelated to the improvement of pain intensity or low back pain related-disability. These findings have challenged the traditional emphasis of using TVA-targeted intervention to treat low back pain.

=== Exercise ===
The most well known method of strengthening the TVA is the vacuum exercise. The TVA also (involuntarily) contracts during many lifts; it is the body's natural weight-lifting belt, stabilizing the spine and pelvis during lifting movements. It has been estimated that the contraction of the TVA and other muscles reduces the vertical pressure on the intervertebral discs by as much as 40%. Failure to engage the TVA during higher intensity lifts is dangerous and encourages injury to the spine. The TVA acts as a girdle or corset by creating hoop tension around the midsection.

== Additional images ==
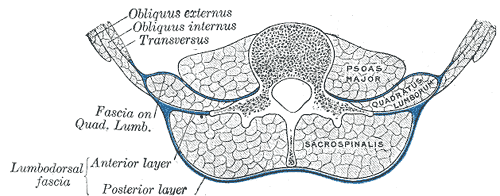
Diagram of a transverse section of the posterior abdominal wall, to show the disposition of the lumbodorsal fascia

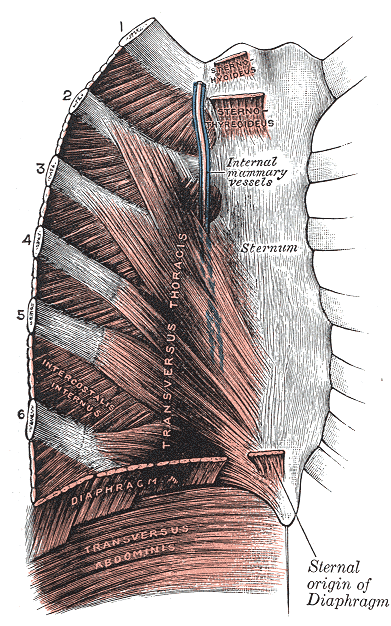
Posterior surface of sternum and costal cartilages, showing Transversus thoracis

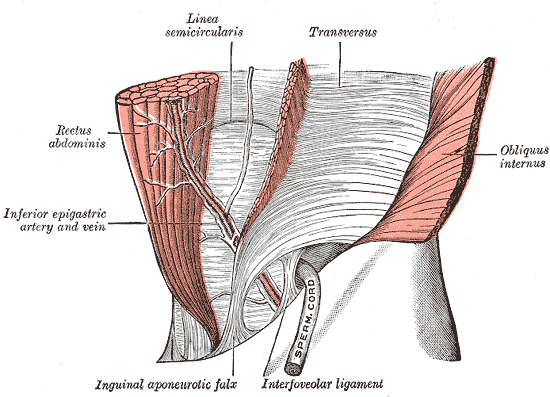
The interfoveolar ligament, seen from in front

Diagram of sheath of Rectus

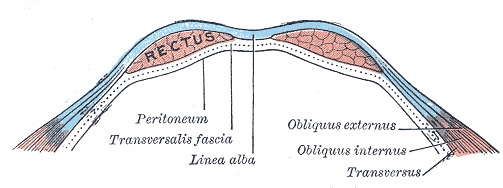
Diagram of a transverse section through the anterior abdomina wall, below the linea semicircularis

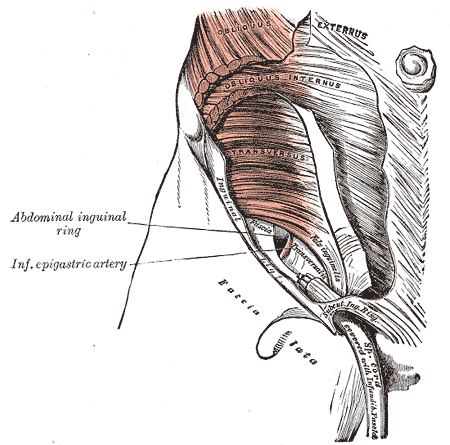
The abdominal inguinal ring

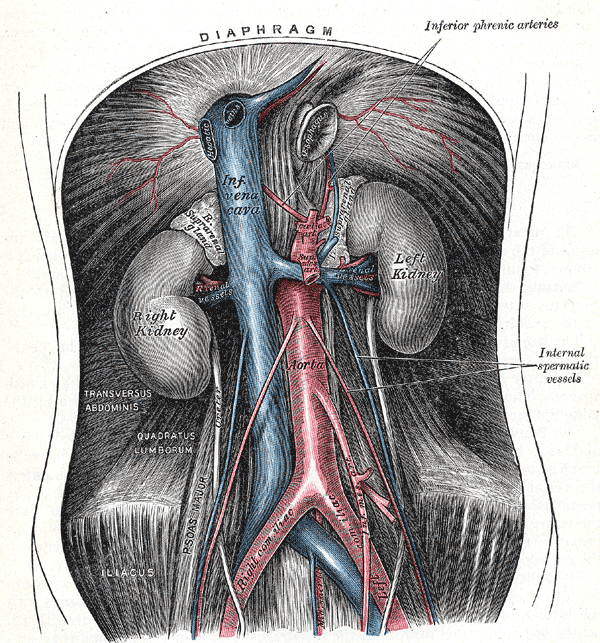
The abdominal aorta and its branches

== See also ==
Transversus thoracis muscle
