= Carnett's sign =

Medical sign that abdominal pain does not decrease when relevant muscles are tensed

- Specialty: Gastroenterology
- Differential diagnosis: Abdominal wall pain

In medicine, Carnett's sign is a finding on clinical examination in which (acute) abdominal pain remains unchanged or increases when the muscles of the abdominal wall are tensed. For this part of the abdominal examination, the patient can be asked to lift the head and shoulders from the examination table to tense the abdominal muscles. An alternative is to ask the patient to raise both legs with straight knees.

A positive test indicates the increased likelihood that the abdominal wall and not the abdominal cavity is the source of the pain (for example, due to rectus sheath hematoma instead of appendicitis). A negative Carnett's sign is said to occur when the abdominal pain decreases when the patient is asked to lift the head; this points to an intra-abdominal cause of the pain.

== History ==
This test was first described by John B. Carnett in 1926. The first clear description of anterior abdominal wall pain arising from structures other than the underlying viscera was Edgar Ferdinand Cyriax in 1919. Cyriax considered that pain could be mimicked by lesions that arose from the vertebra, ribs or other associated structure or that they were the result of direct irritation of intercostal nerves. By identifying conditions such as alterations in the normal vertebral curves, minor subluxation of vertebral bodies and pressure on the peripheral portions of the intercostal nerves, he was able to employ various mechanical treatments to correct the abnormalities and relieve his patients’ symptoms. Despite this paper little attention was paid to this problem until Carnett developed his simple clinical test. Carnett thought that lower abdominal pain was commonly caused by the lower six thoracic nerves and wanted to be able to distinguish this origin from that arising from the viscera.

== Differential diagnosis ==
The differential diagnosis of a positive Carnett's test includes hernias, nerve entrapment syndrome, irritation of intercostal nerve roots, thoracic disk herniations, anterior cutaneous nerve entrapment, slipping rib syndrome, myofascial pain, trigger points and rectus sheath hematomas.

All abdominal wall hernias may be associated with pain and Carnett's test may be useful in their evaluation. The hernias of the anterior abdominal wall include: epigastric hernias, umbilical hernias, spigelian hernias and incisional hernias. Those of the groin include: direct inguinal hernia, indirect inguinal hernia, femoral hernia and sports hernia. Those of the pelvic wall include: sciatic hernia, obturator hernia and perineal hernia. The support hernias include: vault prolapse, enterocele, cystocele, rectocele and uterine decensus. Although most hernias can be detected clinically with the presence of a lump with an expansile cough impulse some may be difficult to detect either because they are small or because the patient is obese. In cases where the diagnosis is suspected but clinically unconfirmed, additional investigation using radiography or ultrasonography may be helpful. Herniography, in which contrast medium is introduced into the peritoneal cavity, has been successfully used to reveal previously unsuspected inguinal hernias in patients with groin pain of uncertain origin and to detect impalpable interparietal lesions such as Spigelian hernias.

Slipping rib syndrome is characterized by pain along the costal margin and is caused by laxity of the eighth, ninth and tenth ribs at the interchondral junctions. These ribs do not articulate with the sternum but instead are bound to each other by a thin band of fibrous tissue. If this fibrous attachment becomes dislocated, the rib(s) may ride up and irritate the intercostal nerve(s), causing pain. Clinically the patient may be aware of a popping or clicking sensation as the ribs move relative to one another. The symptoms can be reproduced by the "hooking maneuver", in which the examiner will hook their fingers under the costal margin and pull upwards.

Spontaneous rectus sheath hematoma arises from rupture of the epigastric vessels. The patient usually presents with a sudden well-localized abdominal pain associated with a tender nonpulsatile abdominal mass, usually in the lower abdomen. There is frequently a plausible precipitating factor such as local trauma, a bout of coughing or anticoagulant therapy. The diagnosis can be confirmed on ultrasound examination and a conservative approach to treatment can be adopted provided that the hematoma does not enlarge. Carnett's test may be diagnostic in this setting.
