= Costochondritis =

Inflammation of the upper rib joints

- Other names: Chest wall pain syndrome, costosternal syndrome
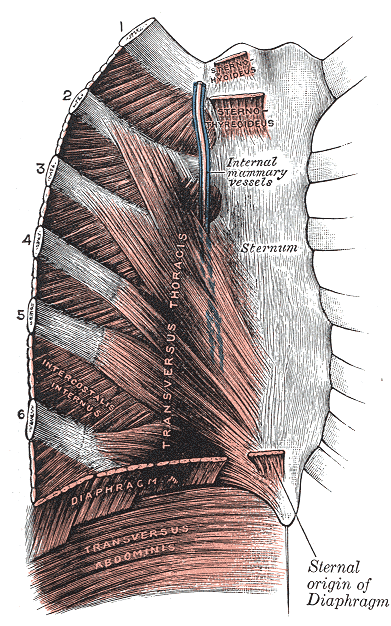
- The costal cartilages
- Specialty: Family medicine, internal medicine, general practitioners, rheumatology, orthopedics
- Symptoms: Chest pain
- Risk factors: Strenuous coughing, exercise, lifting, infection of the costosternal joint
- Diagnostic method: Clinical physical examination and the ruling out of other conditions
- Differential diagnosis: Acute coronary syndrome, pneumothorax, pulmonary embolism, aortic dissection, angina, myocardial infarction, Tietze syndrome, slipping rib syndrome, rib fracture, fibromyalgia, pneumonia
- Treatment: Analgesics, nonsteroidal anti-inflammatory drugs, ice, heat, rest, manual therapy, TENS unit, injections, opioids

Costochondritis, also known as chest wall pain syndrome or costosternal syndrome, is a benign inflammation of the upper costochondral (rib to cartilage) and sternocostal (cartilage to sternum) joints. 90% of patients are affected in multiple ribs on a single side, typically at the 2nd to 5th ribs. Chest pain, the primary symptom of costochondritis, is considered a symptom of a medical emergency, making costochondritis a common presentation in the emergency department. One study found costochondritis was responsible for 30% of patients with chest pain in an emergency department setting.

The exact cause of costochondritis is not known; however, it is believed to be due to repetitive minor trauma, called microtrauma. In rarer cases, costochondritis may develop as a result of an infectious factor. Diagnosis is predominantly clinical and based on physical examination, medical history, and ruling other conditions out. Costochondritis is often confused with Tietze syndrome, due to the similarity in location and symptoms, but with Tietze syndrome being differentiated by swelling of the costal cartilage.

Costochondritis is considered a self-limited condition that will resolve on its own. Treatment options usually involve rest, pain medications such as nonsteroidal anti-inflammatory drugs (NSAIDs), ice, heat, and manual therapy. Cases with persistent discomfort may be managed with an intercostal nerve blocking injection utilizing a combination of corticosteroids and local anesthetic. The condition predominantly affects women over the age of 40, though some studies have found costochondritis to still be common among adolescents presenting with chest pain.

== Terminology ==
The word "costochondritis" is derived from "Costo-" (Latin "costa," meaning "rib"), "Chondr-" (Greek "chondros," which means "cartilage") and "-itis" (Greek suffix that denotes inflammation).

== Presentation ==
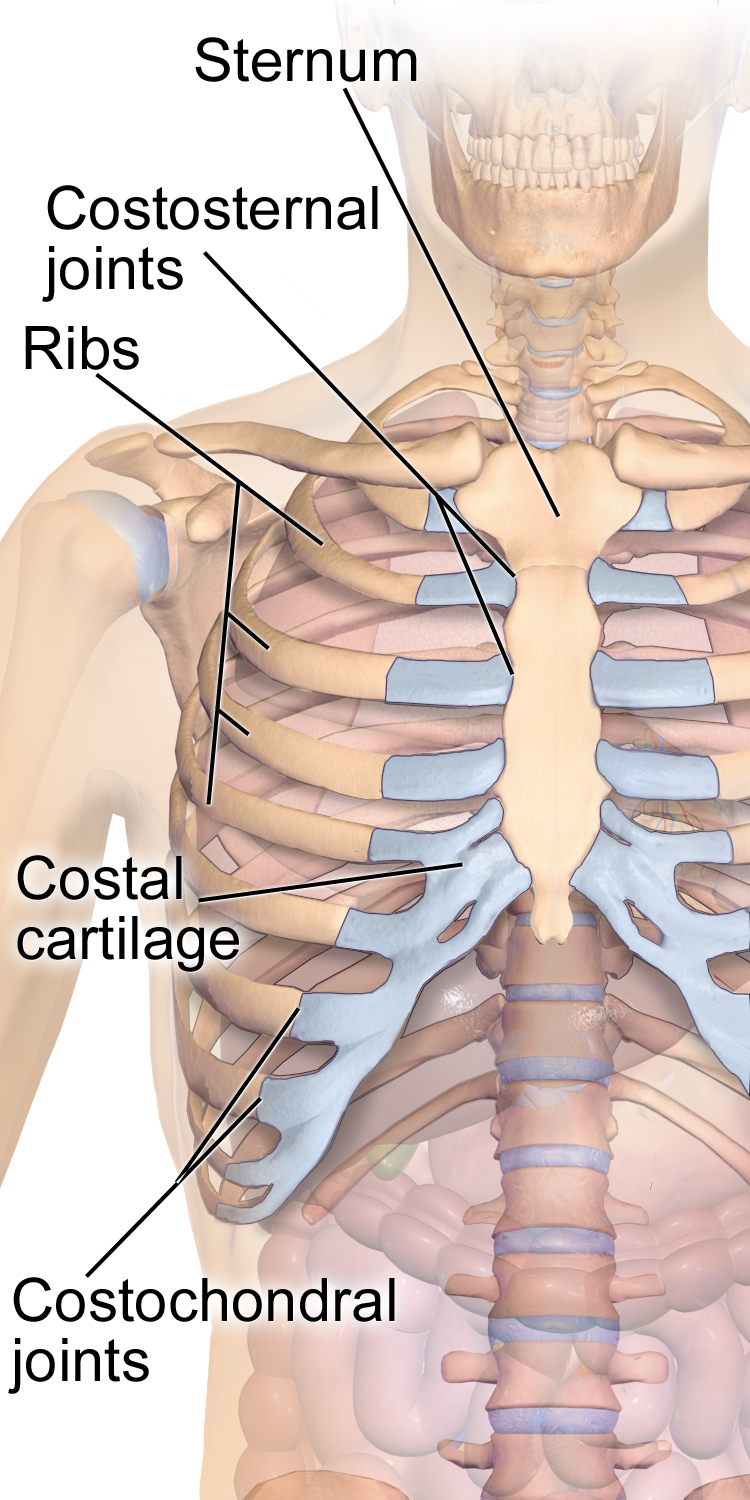
Anatomy of the costal cartilage

Costochondritis typically presents unilaterally (one side), which is typically the left side. It affects primarily the 2nd to 5th ribs at the sternocostal and costochondral joints. The most commonly reported symptom of costochondritis is chest pain that is often exacerbated by movement and deep breathing. Pain is typically widespread and reproducible with palpation of the anterior (front) chest at the affected joints. Pain from costochondritis can vary between individuals, and is typically described as a sharp, aching, dull, or pressure-like pain. It may also be accompanied by a radiating pain to the shoulder, arm, front neck, or scapula (shoulder blade).

The condition usually onsets gradually following repetitive coughing, strenuous physical activity, or trauma to the chest. Symptoms of costochondritis may be recurrent and last weeks to months; however, refractory cases of the condition can persist to over a year.

Costochondritis does not present with heat, erythema, or swelling of the affected area, the presence of which would indicate Tietze syndrome. Additionally, symptoms such as tachycardia, hypotension, radiating pain, shortness of breath, fever, nausea, or a productive cough are unrelated to costochondritis. These signs warrant further investigation for other, more serious causes of chest pain.

=== Comorbidity ===
Fibromyalgia may increase the pain effects of costochondritis.

== Cause ==
The exact etiology of costochondritis is unknown. Repetitive minor trauma is proposed to be a likely cause, with risk factors such as strenuous coughing, exercise, and lifting identified.

Infection of the costosternal joint may cause costochondritis in rare cases. Most cases of infectious costochondritis are caused by Actinomyces, Staphylococcus aureus, Candida albicans, and Salmonella. In rare cases, Escherichia coli can be a cause of infectious costochondritis. Costochondritis can also arise from seronegative spondyloarthropathies, thoracic tumors, intravenous drug use, breast cancer, and rheumatologic disorders.

== Pathogenesis ==
The pathogenesis underlying the development of costochondritis remains unclear. Proposed mechanisms of pain include neurogenic inflammation, muscular imbalances, neuropathy of the intercostal nerves, myofascial pain, or mechanical dysfunction.

== Diagnosis ==
Costochondritis is predominately a clinical diagnosis only after life-threatening conditions have been ruled out, with physical examination and medical history being considered. Before a costochondritis diagnosis is made, other serious causes of chest pain are investigated. Further evaluation for cardiopulmonary or neoplastic causes is typically based on history, age, and risk factors, with diagnostic imaging and tests, completed to assess for life-threatening emergencies. If there is a suspicion of infection or a rheumatoid condition, laboratory work may be conducted.

A physical exam will assess for tenderness or pain upon palpation, with an absence of heat, erythema, or swelling. The physical exam may assess if the pain is worsened with movements of the upper body or breathing, and may be reproduced upon using the crowing rooster maneuver, the hooking maneuver, or the horizontal flexion maneuver. Medical history is considered in diagnosing costochondritis, such as inquiry regarding any recent trauma, coughing, exercise, or activity involving the upper body that may have caused the symptoms.

=== Differential diagnosis ===
==== Cardiopulmonary ====
Life-threatening medical emergencies that may be associated with chest wall pain include acute coronary syndrome, aortic dissection, pneumothorax, or pulmonary embolism. Other cardiopulmonary causes of chest pain similar to that produced by costochondritis may include but are not limited to myocardial infarction, angina, and pericarditis. With costochondritis, the pain is typically worse with respiration, with movement, or within certain positions. Typically with other causes of chest pain, individuals will likely have radiating pain, shortness of breath, fever, a productive cough, nausea, dizziness, tachycardia, or hypotension.

These conditions will be ruled out using tests such as X-rays, which will help assess for pneumonia, pneumothorax, lung mass, and other concerns. Other tests such as an electrocardiogram (ECG) can be performed to exclude infection, ischemia, and other conditions. A laboratory workup can rule out acute coronary syndrome, pulmonary embolism, and pneumonia. Costochondritis will yield normal results for these tests.

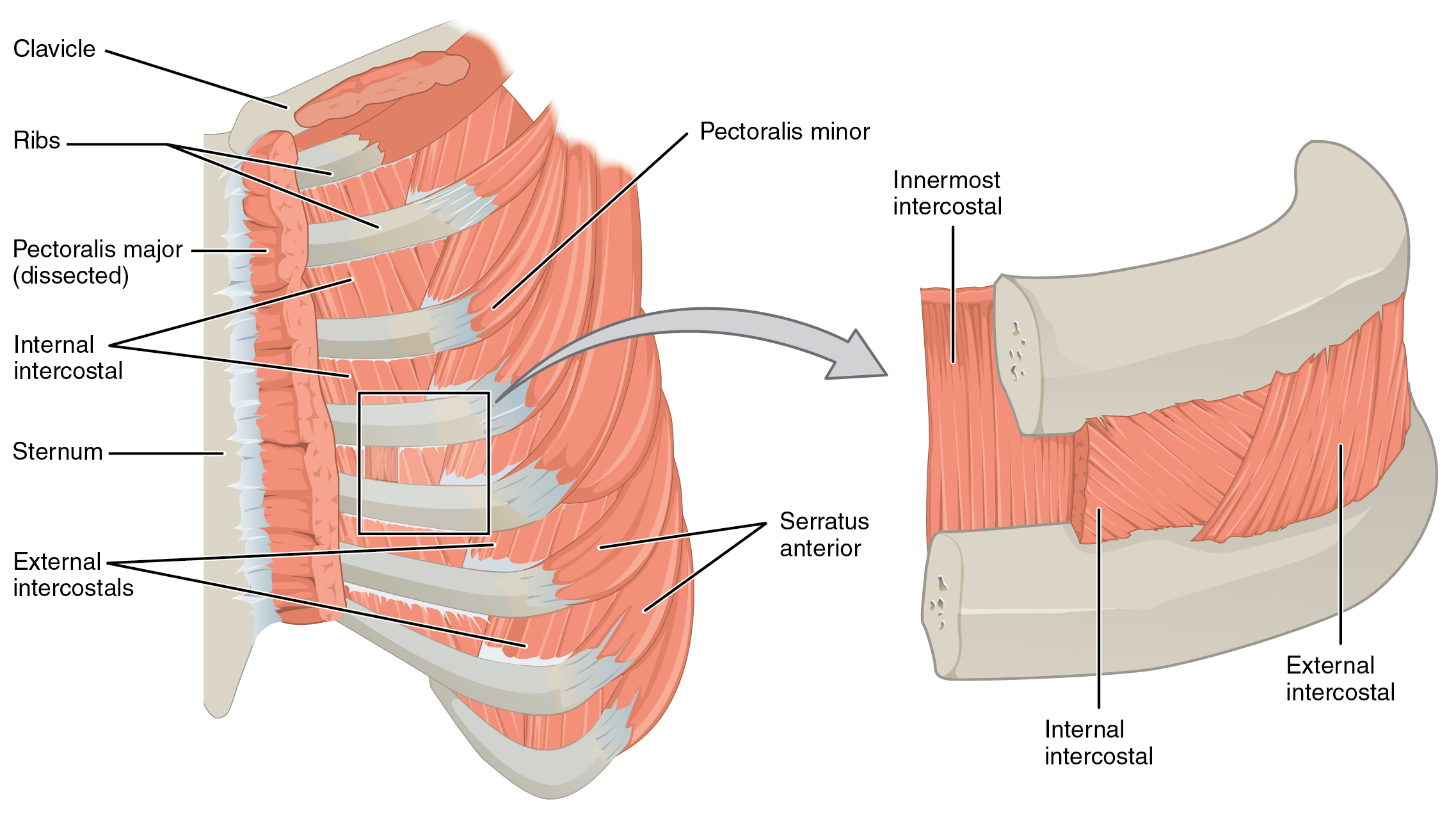
Muscles of the thoracic wall

==== Musculoskeletal ====
There are several musculoskeletal conditions similar to costochondritis that are often confused. One such condition includes Tietze syndrome, which is often confused with costochondritis due to the similarity in location and symptomatology. Typically, costochondritis is a more common condition that is not associated with any swelling, affects multiple joints (usually of the 2nd to 5th ribs), and is usually seen in individuals older than 40 years of age. Tietze syndrome is a rarer condition that usually has visible swelling, commonly affecting a single joint (usually of the 2nd or 3rd rib), and typically seen in individuals younger than 40 years of age.

A similar condition known as slipping rib syndrome is also associated with chest pain and inflammation of the costal cartilage. Unlike costochondritis, the pain associated with slipping rib syndrome is often felt in the lower ribs, abdomen, and back, commonly affecting the interchondral junctions of the false 8th to 10th ribs. Costochondritis is typically experienced within the sternocostal junctions of the true 2nd to 5th ribs.

Other musculoskeletal conditions that may cause chest pain similar to costochondritis includes but are not limited to, painful xiphoid syndrome, muscle strain, myofascial pain syndrome, thoracic disk herniation, and rib fracture.

==== Other ====
- Rheumatologic conditions such as fibromyalgia, SAPHO syndrome, ankylosing spondylitis, rheumatoid arthritis, and psoriatic arthritis can cause symptoms similar to costochondritis.
- Oncology-related conditions, namely neoplasms and myelomatous pleural effusion have been associated with chest pain.
- Chest pain is occasionally experienced with respiratory-related conditions such as pleuritis, precordial catch syndrome, and pneumonia.
- Psychogenic conditions such as anxiety disorders, panic disorders, and hyperventilation syndrome may cause chest pain.
- Some gastroenterology conditions may be associated with costochondritis-like chest pain such as gastroesophageal reflux disease, and esophagitis.
- Vitamin D deficiency can be a differential diagnosis for costochondritis as it may cause chest pain.
- Chest pain has also been reported following the use of cocaine, which can increase the risk of various cardiovascular conditions.

== Outlook, treatment and prevention ==
=== Outlook ===
Costochondritis is usually self-limited, meaning that it will typically resolve on its own without treatment. It may last for several weeks or longer.

=== Treatment ===
Conservative methods are often the first method to treat the condition. If the condition is a result of trauma or over-use of the upper extremity, individuals will be told to rest and avoid activities. Pain relief medications (analgesics) such as acetaminophen, or the use of nonsteroidal anti-inflammatory drugs (NSAIDs) such as ibuprofen, naproxen, or meloxicam may be suggested to relieve discomfort. If the pain is localized, occasionally creams and patches containing compounds such as capsaicin, NSAIDs, or lidocaine may be used. Heat or ice compresses may also be used for treatment.

Outpatient follow-up may also be a form of treatment for costochondritis. Manual therapy methods such as myofascial release, muscle energy techniques, balanced ligamentous tension (BLT), rib mobilization techniques, and stretching exercises may be used. Additionally, educating the individual with costochondritis about their body mechanics, posture, and activity modification can be beneficial.

In severe cases where symptoms do not resolve and last up to a year or longer, corticosteroids or local anesthetic injections may be considered.

=== Prevention ===
Prevention may be helped by avoiding putting stress on chest and ribs.

== Epidemiology ==
Costochondritis is a common condition that is responsible for approximately 13–36% of acute chest pain-related concerns from adults depending on the setting, with 14–39% for adolescents. It is most often seen in individuals who are older than 40 years of age and occurs more often in women than in men.
