= Tietze =

Tietze is a German surname, sometimes also spelled Tieze.

- Tietze (surname)

Also:

- Named for German mathematician Heinrich Tietze:
  - Tietze extension theorem
  - Tietze's graph
  - Tietze transformation in mathematics, named after Heinrich Tietze
- Tietze syndrome in medicine, named after Alexander Tietze
