= Sternocostal ligament =

Sternocostal ligament may refer to:

- Interarticular sternocostal ligament
- Radiate sternocostal ligaments
