= Titze =

Titze is a German surname. Notable people with the surname include:

- Ingo Titze (fl. 1963–2015), American voice scientist
- Ludwig Titze (1797–1850), Austrian singer
- Uta Titze-Stecher (1942–2024), German politician
- Willi Titze (1890–1979), German painter

== See also ==
- Titz
- Tietze
