= Tietze syndrome =

Inflammation, tenderness, and pain of the chest wall with swelling present

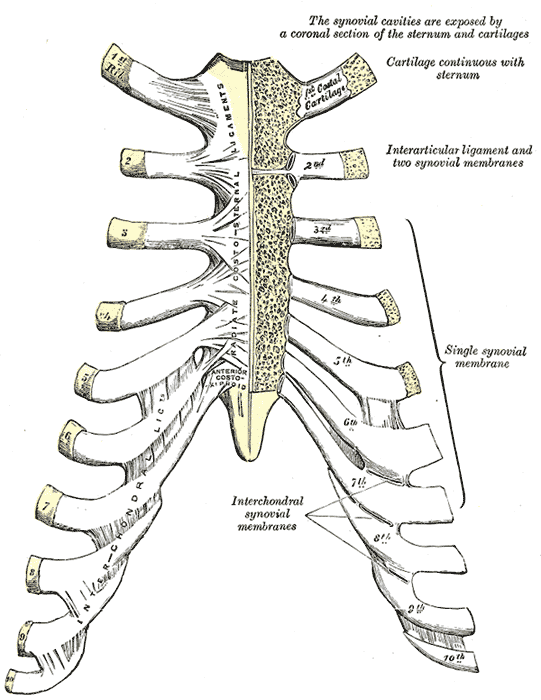
- Sternocostal and interchondral joints
- Specialty: Family medicine, general practitioners, internal medicine, rheumatology, orthopedics
- Symptoms: Chest pain, swelling and tenderness of the chest
- Diagnostic method: Physical examination, the ruling out of other conditions, radiologic imaging
- Differential diagnosis: Angina pectoris, myocardial infarction, pleurisy, pneumothorax, pulmonary embolism, neoplasm, aortic dissection, pneumonia, rib fracture, costochondritis, slipping rib syndrome, intercostal neuralgia, rheumatic disorders
- Treatment: Analgesics, NSAIDs, manual therapy, heat therapy, nerve blocks, surgical intervention

Tietze syndrome is a benign inflammation of one or more of the costal cartilages. It was first described in 1921 by German surgeon Alexander Tietze and was subsequently named after him. The condition is characterized by tenderness and painful swelling of the anterior (front) chest wall at the costochondral (rib to cartilage), sternocostal (cartilage to sternum), or sternoclavicular (clavicle to sternum) junctions. Tietze syndrome affects the true ribs and has a predilection for the 2nd and 3rd ribs, commonly affecting only a single joint.

In environments such as the emergency department, an estimated 20-50% of non-cardiac chest pain is due to a musculoskeletal cause. Despite musculoskeletal conditions such as Tietze syndrome being a common reason for visits to the emergency room, they are frequently misdiagnosed as angina pectoris, pleurisy, and other serious cardiopulmonary conditions due to similar presentation. Though Tietze syndrome can be misdiagnosed, life-threatening conditions with similar symptoms such as myocardial infarction (heart attack) should be ruled out prior to diagnosis of other conditions.

Tietze syndrome is often confused with costochondritis. Tietze syndrome is differentiated from costochondritis by swelling of the costal cartilages, which does not appear in costochondritis. Additionally, costochondritis affects the 2nd to 5th ribs while Tietze syndrome typically affects the 2nd or 3rd rib.

== Presentation ==
Tietze syndrome typically presents unilaterally at a single joint of the anterior chest wall, with 70% of patients having tenderness and swelling on only one side, usually at the 2nd or 3rd rib. Research has described the condition to be both sudden and gradual, varying by the individual. Pain and swelling from Tietze syndrome are typically chronic and intermittent and can last from a few days to several weeks.

The most common symptom of Tietze syndrome is pain, primarily in the chest, but can also radiate to the shoulder and arm. The pain has been described as aching, gripping, neuralgic, sharp, dull, and even described as "gas pains". The symptoms of Tietze syndrome have been reported to be exacerbated by sneezing, coughing, deep inhalation, and overall physical exertion. Tenderness and swelling of the affected joint are important symptoms of Tietze syndrome and differentiate the condition from costochondritis. It has also been suggested that discomfort can be further aggravated due to restricted shoulder and chest movement.

== Cause ==
The true etiology of Tietze syndrome has not been established, though several theories have been proposed. One popular theory is based on observations that many patients begin developing symptoms following a respiratory infection and dry cough, with one study finding 51 out of 65 patients contracted Tietze syndrome after either a cough or respiratory infection. Thus, it has been hypothesized that the repetitive mild trauma of a severe cough from a respiratory infection may produce small tears in the ligament called microtrauma, causing Tietze syndrome. However, this theory is disputed as it does not account for symptoms such as the onset of attacks while at rest as well as the fact that swelling sometimes develops before a cough. The respiratory infection has also been observed accompanying rheumatoid arthritis which, coupled with leukocytosis, neutrophilia, c-reactive protein (CRP), and elevated erythrocyte sedimentation rate (ESR), suggest an infectious and rheumatoid factor, though the evidence is conflicting. Many theories such as malnutrition, chest trauma, and tuberculosis, were thought to be among the potential causes but have since been disproven or left unsupported.

== Diagnosis ==
Diagnosis for Tietze syndrome is primarily a clinical one, though some studies suggest the use of radiologic imaging. Musculoskeletal conditions are estimated to account for 20-50% of non-cardiac related chest pain in the emergency department. Ruling out other conditions, especially potentially life-threatening ones such as myocardial infarction (heart attack) and angina pectoris, is extremely important as they can present similarly to Tietze syndrome. These can usually be ruled out with diagnostic tools such as an electrocardiogram and a physical examination showing reproducible chest wall tenderness. After eliminating other possible conditions, physical examination is considered the most accurate tool in diagnosing Tietze syndrome. Physical examination consists of gentle pressure to the chest wall with a single finger to identify the location of the discomfort. Swelling and tenderness upon palpation at one or more of the costochondral, sternocostal, or sternoclavicular joints is a distinctive trait of Tietze syndrome and is considered a positive diagnosis when found.

There are some pathological features that can be observed with Tietze syndrome, including degeneration of the costal cartilage, increase in vascularity, and hypertrophic changes (enlarged cells). However, these features can only be identified from a biopsy. Some studies have begun exploring and defining the use of radiographic imaging for diagnosing Tietze syndrome. This includes computed tomography (CT), magnetic resonance imaging (MRI), bone scintigraphy, and ultrasound, though these are only case studies and the methods described have yet to be thoroughly investigated. Methods such as plain radiographs, better known as an x-ray, are helpful in the exclusion of other conditions, but not in the diagnosis of Tietze syndrome. Some researchers believe that ultrasound is superior to other available imaging methods, as it can visualize the increased volume, swelling, and structural changes of the costal cartilage.

=== Differential diagnosis ===
The symptoms of Tietze syndrome can display as a wide variety of conditions, making it difficult to diagnose, especially to physicians unaware of the condition. Due to its presentation, Tietze syndrome can be misdiagnosed as a number of conditions, including myocardial infarction (heart attack), angina pectoris, and neoplasms.

Costochondritis is most commonly confused with Tietze syndrome, as they have similar symptoms and can both affect the costochondral and sternocostal joints. Costochondritis is considered a more common condition and is not associated with any swelling to the affected joints, which is the defining distinction between the two. Tietze syndrome commonly affects the 2nd or 3rd rib and typically occurs among a younger age group, while costochondritis affects the 2nd to 5th ribs and has been found to occur in older individuals, usually over the age of 40. In addition, ultrasound can diagnose Tietze syndrome, whereas costochondritis relies heavily on physical examination and medical history.

Another condition that can be confused for Tietze syndrome and costochondritis is slipping rib syndrome (SRS). All three conditions are associated with chest pain as well as inflammation of the costal cartilage. Unlike both costochondritis and Tietze syndrome, which affect some of the true ribs (1st to 7th), SRS affects the false ribs (8th to 10th). SRS is characterized by the partial dislocation, or subluxation, of the joints between the costal cartilages. This causes inflammation, irritated intercostal nerves, and straining of the intercostal muscles. SRS can cause abdominal and back pain, which costochondritis does not. Tietze syndrome and SRS can both present with radiating pain to the shoulder and arm, and both conditions can be diagnosed with ultrasound, though SRS requires a more complex dynamic ultrasound.

The vast differential diagnosis also includes:

- Pleural diseases including pleurisy, pneumonia, pulmonary embolism, and pneumothorax.
- Rheumatic disorders such as rheumatoid arthritis, ankylosing spondylitis, and rheumatic fever.
- Arthritis of the costal cartilages, including rheumatoid arthritis, septic arthritis (pyogenic), monoarthritis, and psoriatic arthritis.
- Neoplasms, both benign and malignant (cancerous), including chondroma, osteochondroma, multiple myeloma, osteosarcoma, Hodgkin lymphoma, and carcinoma.
- Nerve pain, specifically intercostal neuritis and intercostal neuropathy.
- Aortic dissection, a serious condition involving a tear in the body's largest artery.

== Treatment ==
Tietze syndrome is considered to be a self-limiting condition that usually resolves within a few months with rest. Management for Tietze syndrome usually consists of analgesics and nonsteroidal anti-inflammatory drugs (NSAIDs) such as ibuprofen, aspirin, acetaminophen (paracetamol - not a NSAID), and naproxen. Other methods of management include manual therapy and local heat application. These are intended to relieve pain and are not expected to treat or cure Tietze syndrome as the condition is expected to resolve on its own.

=== Intercostal nerve block ===
A nerve block can be utilized in cases where symptom management is not satisfactory in relieving pain. This is usually a nerve-blocking injection that consists of a combination of steroids such as hydrocortisone, and anesthetics such as lidocaine and procaine, which is typically administered under ultrasound guidance. One study used a combination of triamcinolone hexacetonide and 2% lidocaine in 9 patients and after a week, found an average 82% decrease in size of the affected costal cartilage when assessing with ultrasound as well as a significant improvement of symptoms clinically. However, the long-term effectiveness of the injection is disputed, with multiple researchers describing recurrence of symptoms and repetitive injections.

=== Surgical intervention ===
In refractory cases of Tietze syndrome, where the condition is resistant to other conservative treatment options, surgery is considered. Surgery is uncommon for cases of Tietze syndrome, as many describe Tietze syndrome as manageable under less invasive options. The use of surgery in this context refers to the resection of the affected costal cartilages and some of the surrounding areas. Some surgeons have resected cartilage matching the symptoms of Tietze syndrome under the assumption the cartilage was tubercular. One study describes a case in which surgeons resected a large amount of cartilage, including minutely hypertrophied tissue, as a previous resection failed to relieve symptoms which is believed to be due to improperly resected margins. There is limited literature on surgical treatment of this disease, and overall research on the treatment of severe, chronic forms of Tietze syndrome.

== History ==
Tietze syndrome was named after and first described in 1921 by German surgeon Alexander Tietze. Tietze first cited 4 cases in Germany of painful swelling where he originally believed the condition was as a result of tuberculosis or wartime malnutrition.
