= Twelfth rib syndrome =

Medical condition caused by mobile floating ribs

- Other names: Rib tip syndrome
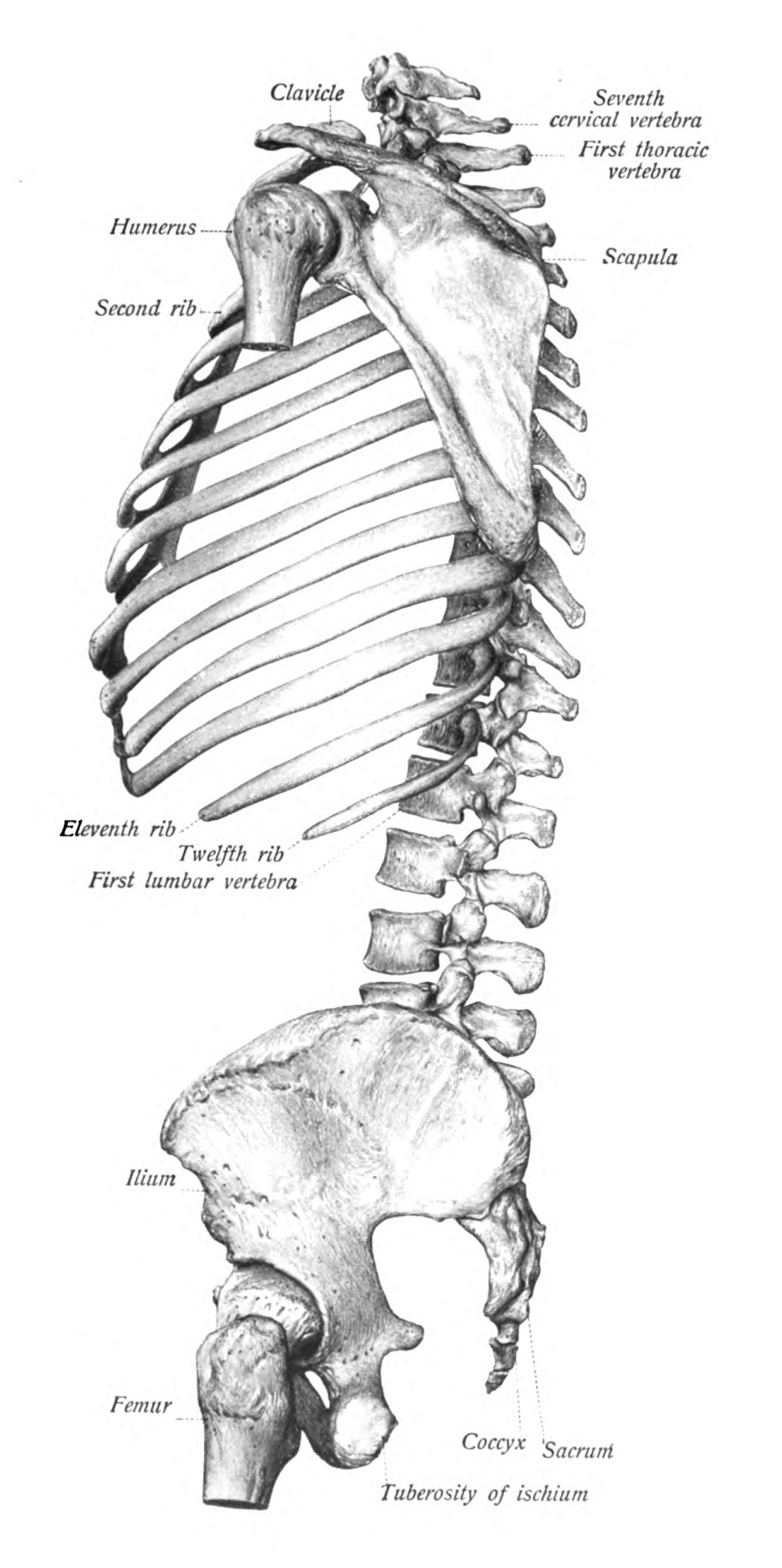
- Side view of the rib cage
- Symptoms: Flank, groin, or loin pain
- Diagnostic method: Physical examination
- Differential diagnosis: Slipping rib syndrome, irritable bowel syndrome, peptic ulcers, renal pathology, aortic aneurysm, sciatica, arachnoiditis, postoperative pain, biliary tract pathology, pleurisy, pneumonia, shingles
- Treatment: Rest, analgesics, NSAIDs, therapeutic techniques, nerve block injections, surgery

Twelfth rib syndrome, also known as rib tip syndrome, is a painful condition that occurs as a result of highly mobile floating ribs. It commonly presents as pain that may be felt in the lower back or lower abdominal region as a result of the 11th or 12th mobile rib irritating the surrounding tissues and nervous systems. Diagnosis is often made by a physical examination after other conditions are ruled out. The condition is often labelled as slipping rib syndrome due to the unclear definitions of the conditions, with twelfth rib syndrome sometimes being referred to as a subtype of slipping rib syndrome.

== Presentation ==
The presentation of twelfth rib syndrome varies between individuals. The predominant symptom experienced by individuals with this condition is abdominal, back, groin, loin, or flank pain, and pain that is typically localized to the 11th and 12th rib tips. The pain is often worse with movement, such as sitting, leaning forward, rotating of the trunk, lifting objects, or bending over. It may be continuous or intermittent, and has been described as dull, achy, or sharp. The pain can typically be reproduced by point tenderness on physical examination. The length of symptomatology of the condition can last weeks or years.

== Pathogenesis ==
The exact cause of the condition is not understood, however the pathogenesis of the condition is likely to involve hypermobility of the floating ribs. These hypermobile 11th and 12th ribs subsequently result in irritation of the intercostal nerves, leading to neuropathic pain.

== Mechanism ==
The rib cage consists of 12 pairs of ribs including the true ribs (1st to 7th), false ribs (8th to 10th), and the floating ribs (11th and 12th). The true ribs are directly connected to the sternum by the costal cartilage. Similarly, the false ribs also connect to the sternum through costal cartilages, however indirectly through a connection to the costal cartilage of the rib above it. Unlike the true and false ribs, the floating 11th and 12th ribs do not connect to the sternum.

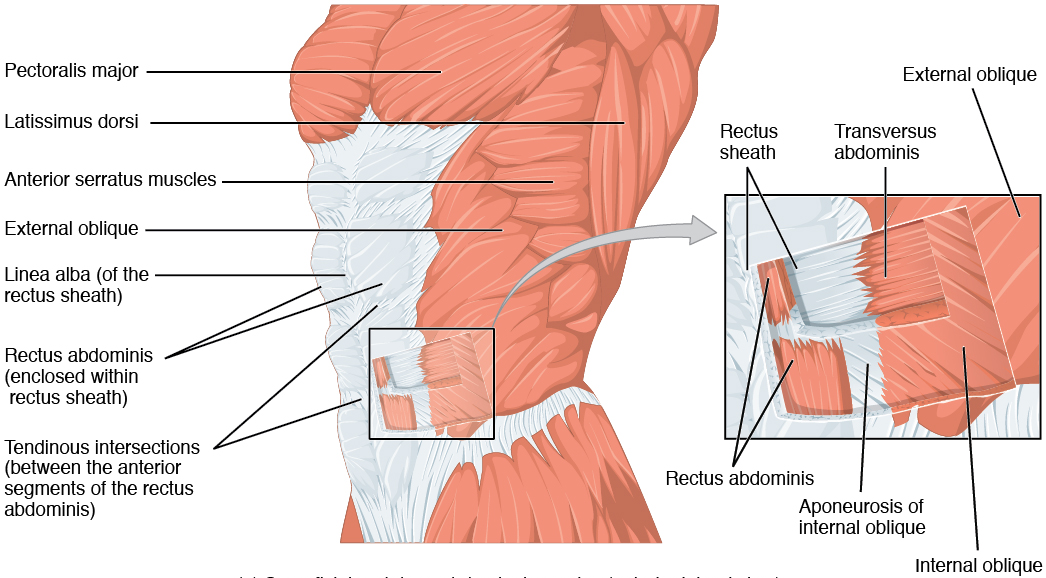
Muscles of the thoracic cage

There is an extensive number of muscle groups that surround the floating ribs such as the external oblique, quadratus lumborum, latissimus dorsi, levator costarum, external intercostals, serratus posterior inferior, lumbocostal ligament, iliocostalis, longissimus thoracis, and the costodiaphragmatic pleural recess. A hypermobile floating rib can cause irritation to these muscles, which as a result can cause variation in the location and intensity of pain felt with twelfth rib syndrome.

Additionally, there is a complex nervous system surrounding the floating ribs. The 12th intercostal nerve communicates with the first lumbar nerve, closely travels next to the subcostal artery, travels behind the kidney, through the aponeurosis of the transversus abdominis, communicates with the iliohypogastric nerve, and gives a branch to the pyramidalis. Irritation of the lower intercostal nerves and surrounding tissues can cause neuropathic pain that may travel or radiate to other parts of the body, such as in the groin or the suprapubic area.

== Diagnosis ==
The diagnosis of twelfth rib syndrome is clinical, often through a diagnosis of exclusion. After excluding other causes for the back, flank, groin, or loin pain, the clinician can confirm the diagnosis by a physical examination of the 11th and 12th ribs. The examiner will palpate the ribs to identify point tenderness locations, often trying to replicate the pain the individual experiences.

=== Differential diagnosis ===
Some individuals with twelfth rib syndrome may be misdiagnosed and undergo investigations or surgical procedures that are unnecessary. Due to the wide range in presentation of the condition, differential diagnoses of conditions that may produce abdominal, back, groin, loin, or flank pain are considered. Many individuals with twelfth rib syndrome often meet with a variety of specialists prior to their diagnosis, commonly within gastroenterology clinics. Conditions that may present similar to twelfth rib syndrome include irritable bowel syndrome, peptic ulcers, renal pathology, aortic aneurysm, sciatica, arachnoiditis, postoperative pain, biliary tract pathology, pleurisy, pneumonia, and shingles. Additionally, twelfth rib syndrome should be differentiated from iliocostal friction syndrome, which involves the lower ribs coming in contact with the iliac crest.

Twelfth rib syndrome is similar to slipping rib syndrome, to which some researchers consider twelfth rib to be a subtype of slipping rib syndrome. The two are commonly confused as a result of unclear definitions of the ribs involved with slipping rib syndrome, however they have different presentation and diagnostic criteria. Slipping rib syndrome predominantly presents as upper abdominal, chest, and back pain, whereas twelfth rib syndrome predominantly affects the lower abdomen, groin, and back. Diagnosis of slipping rib syndrome is also clinical, however utilizes the hooking maneuver, which twelfth rib syndrome does not.

== Treatment ==
The first line of method to treat twelfth rib syndrome is conservative measures. Usually individuals will be advised to reduce their physical activity or movements that exacerbate their symptoms. Individuals will be suggested to use ice packs, heat packs, analgesic medications or nonsteroidal anti-inflammatory drugs to manage the pain. Other conservative therapeutic measures such as physiotherapy, ultrasound therapy, transcutaneous electrical nerve stimulation (TENS), or cryotherapy may be used. In some cases intermittent relief is reported from chiropractic manipulations and electric stimulation.

If conservative measures do not provide relief, intercostal or costovertebral nerve blocks may be used. Repeated injections may be necessary as these injections may not provide long-term relief. Surgical management is a permanent solution for cases in which do not resolve with repeated nerve blocks. Surgical excision or resection of the affected rib provides immediate relief of symptoms without recurrence.
