= Slipping rib syndrome =

Pain in the false ribs due to the partial dislocation of the costal cartilage

- Other names: Cyriax syndrome, clicking rib syndrome, painful rib syndrome, displaced ribs, interchondral subluxation
- Illustration of slipping rib syndrome
- Specialty: General surgery, thoracic surgery, orthopedic surgery, sports medicine
- Symptoms: "Popping" or "clicking" sensation in ribs, back pain, abdominal pain, chest pain, aching pain, pain with activity/movement
- Risk factors: Hypermobility, trauma
- Diagnostic method: Physical examination, dynamic ultrasound
- Differential diagnosis: Costochondritis, Tietze syndrome, pleurisy, rib fracture, gastric ulcer, cholecystitis, esophagitis, hepatosplenic abnormalities
- Treatment: Analgesics, injections, surgery

Slipping rib syndrome (SRS) is a condition in which the interchondral ligaments are weakened or disrupted and have increased laxity, causing the costal cartilage tips to subluxate (partially dislocate). This results in pain or discomfort due to pinched or irritated intercostal nerves, straining of the intercostal muscles, and inflammation. The condition affects the 8th, 9th, and 10th ribs, referred to as the false ribs, with the 10th rib most commonly affected.

Slipping rib syndrome was first described by Edgar Ferdinand Cyriax in 1919; however, the condition is rarely recognized and frequently overlooked. A study estimated the prevalence of the condition to be 1% of clinical diagnoses in a general medicine clinic and 5% in a gastroenterology clinic, with a separate study finding it to be 3% in a mixed specialty general medicine and gastroenterology clinic.

The condition has also been referred to as Cyriax syndrome, clicking rib syndrome, painful rib syndrome, interchondral subluxation, or displaced ribs. The term "slipping rib syndrome" was coined by surgeon Robert Davies-Colley in 1922, which has been popularly quoted since.

== Symptoms ==
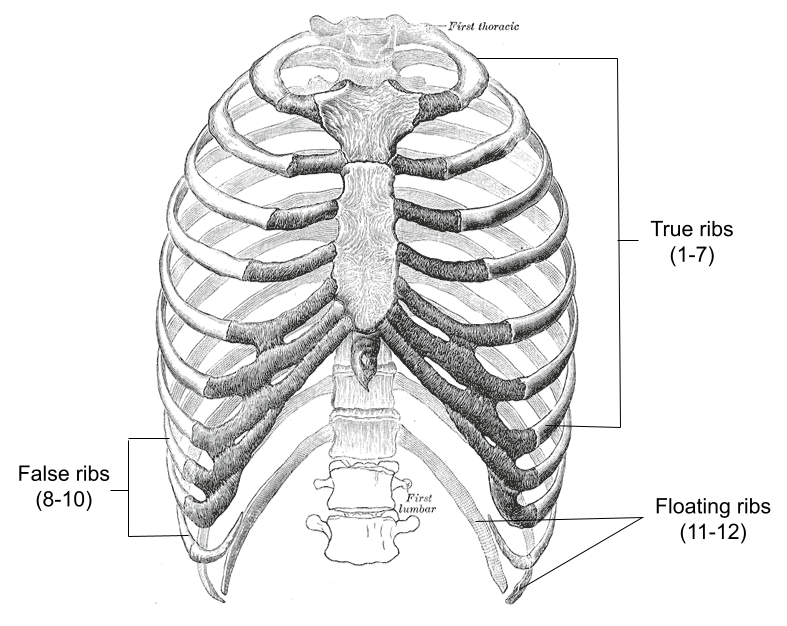
Anatomy of the rib cage

The presentation of slipping rib syndrome varies for each individual and can present at one or both sides of the rib cage, with symptoms appearing primarily in the abdomen and back. Pain is most commonly presented as episodic and varies from a minor nuisance to severely impacting quality of life. It has been reported that symptoms can last from minutes to hours.

One of the commonly reported symptoms of this condition is the sensation of "popping" or "clicking" of the lower ribs as a result of subluxation of the cartilaginous joints. Individuals with SRS report an intense, sharp pain that can radiate from the chest to the back, and may be reproducible by pressing on the affected rib(s). A dull, aching sensation has also been reported by some affected individuals. Certain postures or movements may exacerbate the symptoms, such as stretching, reaching, coughing, sneezing, lifting, bending, sitting, sports activities, and respiration. There have also been reports of vomiting and nausea associated with the condition.

== Risk factors ==
The causes of slipping rib syndrome are unclear, although several risk factors have been suggested. The condition often accompanies a history of physical trauma. This observation could explain reports of the condition among athletes, as they are at increased risk for trauma, especially for certain full-contact sports such as hockey, wrestling, and American football. There have also been reports of slipping rib syndrome among other athletes, such as swimmers, which could plausibly result from repetitive upper body movements coupled with high physical demands.

Reported incidents, in which no history of traumatic impact to the chest wall has been described, are considered a gradual onset condition. Slipping rib syndrome may also result from the presence of a birth defect, such as an unstable bifid rib. Generalized hypermobility has also been suggested to be a possible further risk factor.

== Diagnosis ==
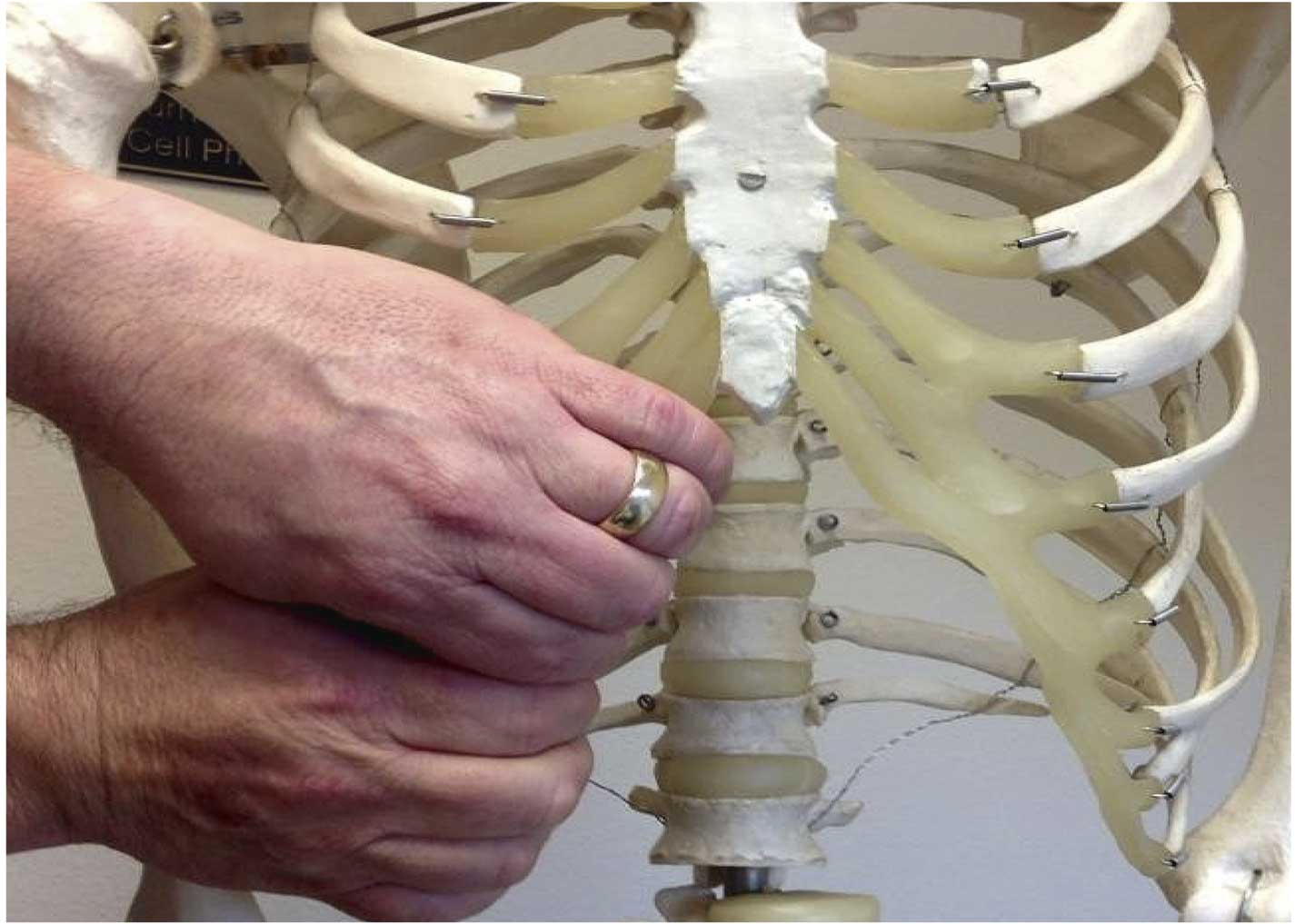
The "hooking maneuver" being performed on a model skeleton

Diagnosing slipping rib syndrome is predominantly clinical, with a physical examination of the affected rib being the most commonly utilized. A technique known as the "hooking maneuver" is commonly used amongst medical professionals to diagnose slipping rib syndrome. The examiner will hook their fingers under the costal margin, then pull in an anterior (outward) and superior (upward) direction, with a positive result when movement or pain is replicated during this action.

Plain radiographs, CT scans, MRI, and standard ultrasound, are all unable to visualize the cartilage affected by SRS; however, they are often used to exclude other conditions. Dynamic ultrasound is occasionally used to evaluate the dynamic laxity or displacement of the cartilage; however, it has been said to be not much superior to that of a physical examination from an experienced physician, as a diagnosis is dependent on the technician's expertise and knowledge of the condition. A positive result of a dynamic ultrasound for slipping rib syndrome requires an observed subluxation of the cartilage, which may be elicited with the Valsalva, crunch, or other maneuvers. Nerve blocking injections have also been utilized as a diagnostic method by noting the absence of pain following an injection to the intercostal nerves of the affected ribs.

=== Differential diagnosis ===
Slipping rib syndrome is often confused with costochondritis and Tietze syndrome, as they also involve the cartilage of the thoracic wall. Costochondritis is a common cause of chest pain, consisting of up to 30% of chest pain complaints in emergency departments. The pain is typically diffused with the upper costochondral or sternocostal junctions most frequently involved, unlike slipping rib syndrome, which involves the lower rib cage. Tietze syndrome differs from these conditions as it is often associated with inflammation and swelling of the costochondral, sternocostal, and sternoclavicular joints, whereas individuals with slipping rib syndrome or costochondritis will exhibit no swelling. Tietze syndrome typically involves the second and third ribs and is usually a result of infectious, rheumatologic, or neoplastic processes.

A condition referred to as twelfth rib syndrome is similar to slipping rib syndrome; however, it affects the floating ribs (11–12) which do not have any attachments to the sternum. Some researchers classify slipping rib syndrome and twelfth rib syndrome into a group referred to as painful rib syndrome, others classify twelfth rib syndrome as a subtype of slipping rib syndrome, and some considering the two to be separate conditions altogether. The two disorders have different presentation and diagnostic criteria, such that a diagnosis for twelfth rib syndrome does not include the hooking maneuver and typically presents as lower back, abdominal, and groin pain.

Other differential diagnosis includes pleurisy, rib fracture, gastric ulcer, cholecystitis, esophagitis, and hepatosplenic abnormalities.

== Treatment ==
Treatment modalities for slipping rib syndrome range from conservative measures to surgical procedures.

=== Conservative measures ===
Conservative measures are often the first forms of treatment offered to patients with slipping rib syndrome, especially those in which symptoms are minor. Often the patients will be reassured and recommended to limit activity, use ice, and take pain medication such as nonsteroidal anti-inflammatory drugs (NSAIDs). Further measures such as osteopathic manipulation treatment (OMT), physical therapy, chiropractic treatment, and acupuncture, are other non-invasive methods that have been used to treat SRS, with the goal of these treatments typically being relief or symptom management. Topical medications are occasionally used, such as Diclofenac gel and lidocaine transdermal patches, which have been noted to provide temporary relief of symptoms.

=== Nerve blocking injections ===
Minimally invasive procedures have been used for individuals with moderate slipping rib syndrome. Nerve blocking injections consisting of steroidal or local anesthetic agents have been commonly reported as a treatment to avoid surgical intervention. This minimally invasive intervention is seen as temporary, with repeated injections necessary to prevent the resurgence of symptoms.

=== Surgical procedures ===
Surgical intervention is often performed in cases where other treatment modalities have failed to provide a solution. There are four types of surgical procedures noted in current literature: costal cartilage removal, rib resection, laparoscopic costal cartilage removal, and rib stabilization with plating.

Costal cartilage removal, or excision, was first attempted in 1922 by Davies-Colley and has been the technique used by several surgeons since then. This method of surgical repair includes removal of the cartilage affected from the sternum to the boned portion of the rib, with or without preserving the perichondrium. Rib resection differentiates from costal cartilage removal as it removes a small bone portion of the affected rib(s). Laparoscopic costal cartilage removal is a minimally invasive, intra-abdominal approach to treating the condition. The affected cartilage is excised from the sternocostal junction to the costochondral junction. Within studies that have performed these procedures, some individuals may experience recurrence of symptoms.

An alternative technique known as rib stabilization with plating is used to prevent subluxation of the affected rib(s) while preserving thorax mobility. It was first used to treat individuals who have undergone previous resection surgeries but experienced a recurrence of symptoms. In this procedure, the ribs are stabilized using a bio-absorbable plate that is anchored onto a stable non-affected rib located above the affected rib(s). The plates are vertically placed onto the ribs and secured using non-absorbable sutures.

A more recent technique of rib stabilization with suturing, colloquially known as the Hansen Method after its creator, is used to bring the affected rib(s) to their normal anatomy. The method uses an orthopedic tape suture to tie the slipped rib around a higher, unaffected rib(s) to stabilize it. This method is similar in concept to the aforementioned method of stabilization with plating; however, the suture is not bioabsorbable.

== Epidemiology ==
Slipping rib syndrome is considered to be underdiagnosed and frequently overlooked. Past literature has noted the condition to be rare or uncommon, but one 1980 study estimated SRS to have 1% of clinical diagnoses in new patients at a general medicine clinic and 5% at a specialty gastroenterology clinic, with the prevalence being even higher for patients referred to the specialty clinic after multiple negative investigations. A separate study from 1993 found that slipping rib syndrome accounted for 3% of new referrals to a mixed specialty general medicine and gastroenterology clinic.

It is unclear whether SRS is more common in women as some studies report an equal gender distribution while others report the condition to occur more often in females. It has been suggested by some researchers that there is a hormonal connection between hormones and the increased ligament laxity observed in females during pregnancy, though this theory has yet to be upheld or explored.

== History ==
Slipping rib syndrome was first mentioned in 1919 by Edgar Ferdinand Cyriax, an orthopedic physician and physiotherapist, who described a chest pain associated with a "popping" or "clicking" sensation. The condition was originally named after him, Cyriax syndrome, but has used multiple names since then, including clicking rib syndrome, painful rib syndrome, interchondral subluxation, and displaced ribs. The name "slipping rib syndrome" was first used by surgeon Robert Davies-Colley and gained popularity, becoming the most commonly quoted term for the condition. Davies-Colley was also the first to describe an operation for slipping rib syndrome, a costal cartilage removal.

The "hooking maneuver" was noted in 1977 by Heinz & Zavala to be useful for slipping rib syndrome as an accurate diagnostic method.
