= Tietze (surname) =

Tietze is a surname. Notable people with the surname include:

- Alexander Tietze (1864–1927), German physician
- Andreas Tietze (1914–2003), Austrian Turkologist
- Carin C. Tietze (born 1964), German actress
- Christopher Tietze (1908–1984), American physician
- Emil Tietze (1845–1931), Austrian geologist
- Erica Tietze-Conrat (1883−1958), Austrian art historian
- Friedel Tietze (1908–1953), German athlete
- Hans Tietze (1880−1954), Austrian art historian
- Heinrich Franz Friedrich Tietze (1880–1964), Austrian mathematician
- Herbert Tietze (born 1909), German jurist
- Karin Tietze-Ludwig (born 1941), German presenter and television announcer
- Lukas Tietze (born 1998), German politician
- Lutz Friedjan Tietze (born 1942), German chemist
- Mark-Stefan Tietze (born 1966), German satirist and author
- Martin Tietze (1908–1942), German luger

== Tieze ==
- Franz Tieze (1842–1932), Bohemian forger

== See also ==
- Tietze (disambiguation)
- Tietz
