= Flushing (physiology) =

Redness of the face due to physiological conditions

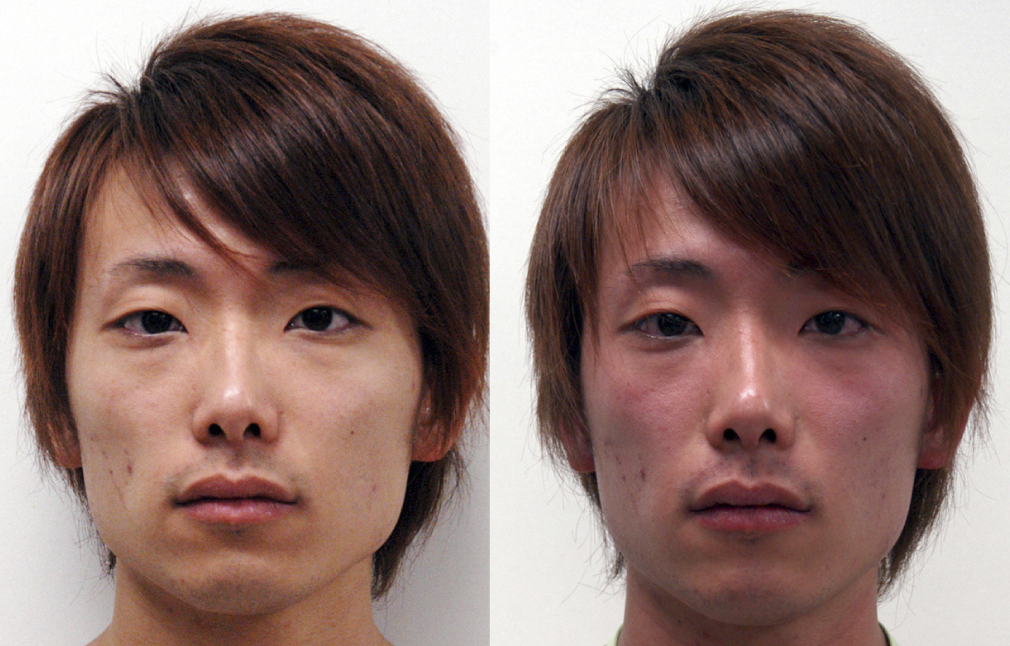
- Facial flushing in a 22-year-old man before (left) and after (right)
- Specialty: Dermatology

Flushing is to become markedly red in the face and often other areas of the skin, from various physiological conditions. Flushing is generally distinguished from blushing, since blushing is psychosomatic, milder, generally restricted to the face, cheeks or ears, and generally assumed to reflect emotional stress, such as embarrassment, anger, or romantic stimulation. Flushing is also a cardinal symptom of carcinoid syndrome—the syndrome that results from hormones (often serotonin or histamine) being secreted into systemic circulation.

== Causes ==
- abrupt cessation of physical exertion (resulting in heart output in excess of current muscular need for blood flow)
- abdominal cutaneous nerve entrapment syndrome (ACNES), usually in patients who have had abdominal surgery
- alcohol flush reaction
- antiestrogens such as tamoxifen
- atropine poisoning
- body contact with warm or hot water (hot tub, bath, shower)
- butorphanol reaction with some narcotic analgesics (since butorphanol is also an antagonist)
- caffeine consumption
- carbon monoxide poisoning
- carcinoid tumor
- chronic obstructive pulmonary disease (COPD), especially emphysema (also known as "pink puffer")
- cluster headache attack or headache
- compression of the nerve by the sixth thoracic vertebrae
- coughing, particularly severe coughing fits
- Cushing's syndrome
- dehydration
- dysautonomia
- emotions: anger, embarrassment (for this reason it is also called erythema pudoris, from the Latinized Greek word for "redness" and the Latin "of embarrassment")
- fever
- fibromyalgia
- histamines
- homocystinuria (flushing across the cheeks)
- Horner's syndrome
- hot flush
- hyperglycaemia
- hyperstimulation of the parasympathetic nervous system, especially the vagus nerve
- hyperthyroidism
- inflammation (for example, caused by allergic reaction or infection)
- iron poisoning
- Jarisch–Herxheimer reaction (caused by antibiotics)
- keratosis pilaris rubra faceii
- Kratom
- mast cell activation syndrome (MCAS)
- mastocytosis
- medullary thyroid cancer
- mixing an antibiotic with alcohol
- neuroendocrine tumors
- niacin (vitamin B_{3})
- pheochromocytoma
- polycythemia vera
- powerful vasodilators, such as dihydropyridine calcium channel blockers
- severe pain
- sexual arousal, especially orgasm (see: Sex flush)
- sexual intercourse (see: Sex flush)
- sneezing (red nose)
- some recreational drugs, such as alcohol, heroin, cocaine and amphetamines
- spicy foods
- sunburn (erythema)
- tachycardia
- vinpocetine

== See also ==
- Cholinergic urticaria
- Erythema
- Pallor
- Rash
