= Borders of heart =

Borders of heart may refer to:

- Left margin of heart
- Right border of heart
