= William Garner Sutherland =

American osteopathic physician

William Garner Sutherland, D.O. (1873–1954) was an American osteopathic physician and important figure in American osteopathic medicine. Several of his manual therapy techniques are still practiced today by osteopathic physicians. Sutherland was the first osteopathic physician to conceptualize the cranial approach and teach it systematically. However, Sutherland acknowledged Andrew Taylor Still as the developer of all osteopathy, including the cranial approach. Sutherland was the first person to claim to feel a rhythmic shape change in the bones of the cranium. He later applied this movement to all body tissues and this movement is the agent of change in dysfunctional tissues. He later named this motion the body's "Primary Respiration."

== Education ==
William Sutherland graduated in 1900 from the American School of Osteopathy, which is now A.T. Still University.

== Contributions to osteopathy ==
A list of techniques and concepts which Sutherland had significant impact on:

- Cranial osteopathy is the source of craniosacral therapy (cranial techniques practiced by non osteopaths)
- Balanced ligamentous tension
- Primary respiratory mechanism

In the United States, Sutherland's approach today is being taught to physicians and dentists by the Osteopathic Cranial Academy, the Sutherland Cranial Teaching Foundation and the Osteopathic Center for Children and Families.

From there, his teachings have since spread worldwide, including Australia and New Zealand by the SCTF of ANZ as well as in the UK and Central and Eastern Europe and Japan.

His writings include The Cranial Bowl, Contributions of Thought, Teachings in the Science of Osteopathy. His wife, Adah, wrote his biography, With Thinking Fingers, which details his exploration of the cranial concept. "Osteopathy in the Cranial Field," written by one of his students, Harold Magoun, DO, is the main textbook of his work.

It has been speculated that Sutherland borrowed ideas directly from the 1882 English translation of Swedenborg's writings on brain physiology.
