= Sternocostal joints =

Joints in the human rib

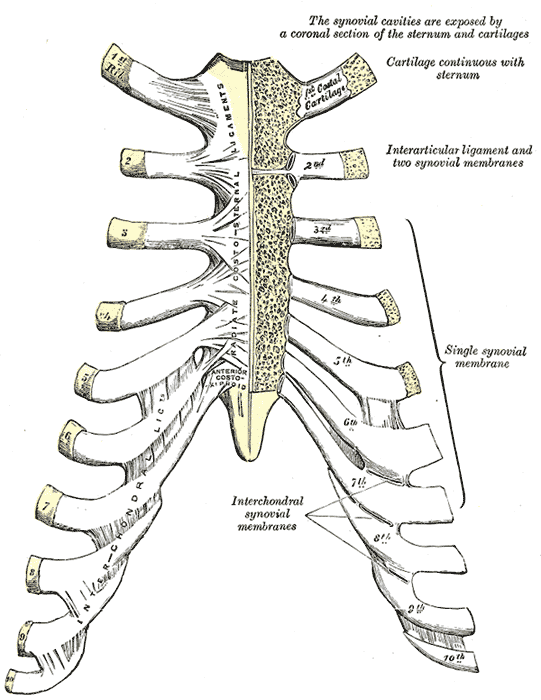
- Sternocostal and interchondral articulations. Anterior view.

Details

Identifiers
- Latin: articulationes sternocostales
- MeSH: D013248
- TA98: A03.3.05.001
- TA2: 1730
- FMA: 72323

The sternocostal joints, also known as sternochondral joints or costosternal articulations, are synovial plane joints of the costal cartilages of the true ribs with the sternum. The only exception is the first rib, which has a synchondrosis joint since the cartilage is directly united with the sternum. The sternocostal joints are important for thoracic wall mobility.

The ligaments connecting them are:

- Articular capsules
- Intraarticular sternocostal ligament
- Radiate sternocostal ligaments
- Costoxiphoid ligaments

== Clinical significance ==
Ankylosis, joint stiffness caused by ossification, may occur at the sternocostal joints.

== See also ==
- Costochondritis
