= Bifid rib =

Bifurcated rib
- Other names: Bifurcated rib, sternum bifidum
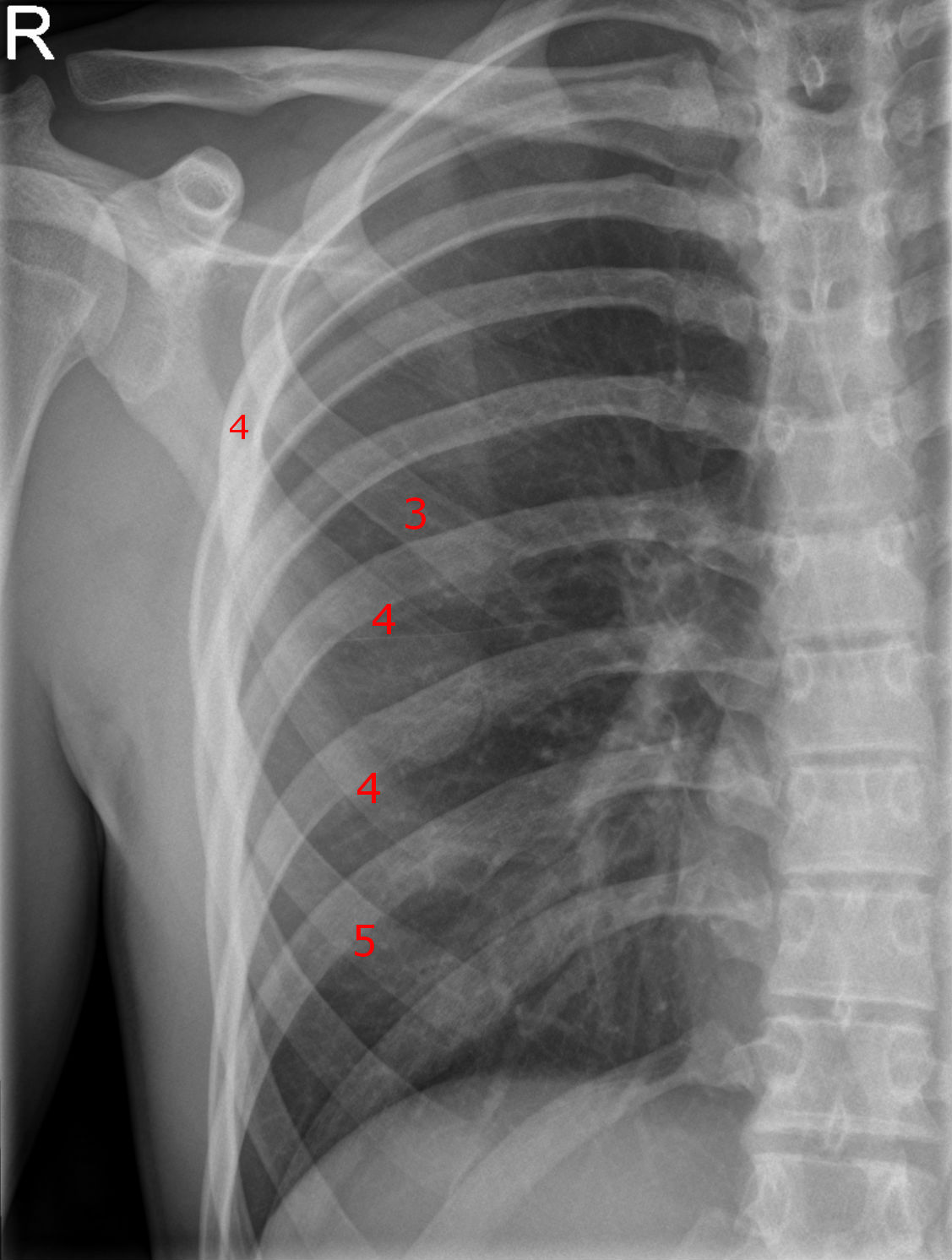
- Bifid rib at the right side seen on chest radiograph. The fourth rib splits in two towards the sternal end.
- Specialty: Medical genetics

A bifid rib is a congenital abnormality of the rib cage and associated muscles and nerves which occurs in about 1.2% of humans. Bifid ribs occur in up to 8.4% of Samoans. The sternal end of the rib is cleaved into two. It is usually unilateral.

Bifid ribs are usually asymptomatic, and are often discovered incidentally by chest X-ray. Effects of this neuroskeletal anomaly can include respiratory difficulties, neurological difficulties, limitations, and limited energy from the stress of needing to compensate for the neurophysiological difficulties. An unstable bifid rib may lead to slipping rib syndrome.

Another association is with odontogenic keratocysts of the jaw, which may behave aggressively and have a high propensity to recur when treated with simple enucleation and curettage. When seen together, the patient is likely to have nevoid basal-cell carcinoma syndrome (Gorlin-Goltz syndrome).

== See also ==
- List of radiographic findings associated with cutaneous conditions
