= Craniosacral therapy =

Pseudoscientific alternative medicine technique

Craniosacral therapy (CST)
- Cranial-sacral therapy; Cranial osteopathy; Cranial therapy; Craniopathy; Sacro-occipital technique; Bio-cranial therapy
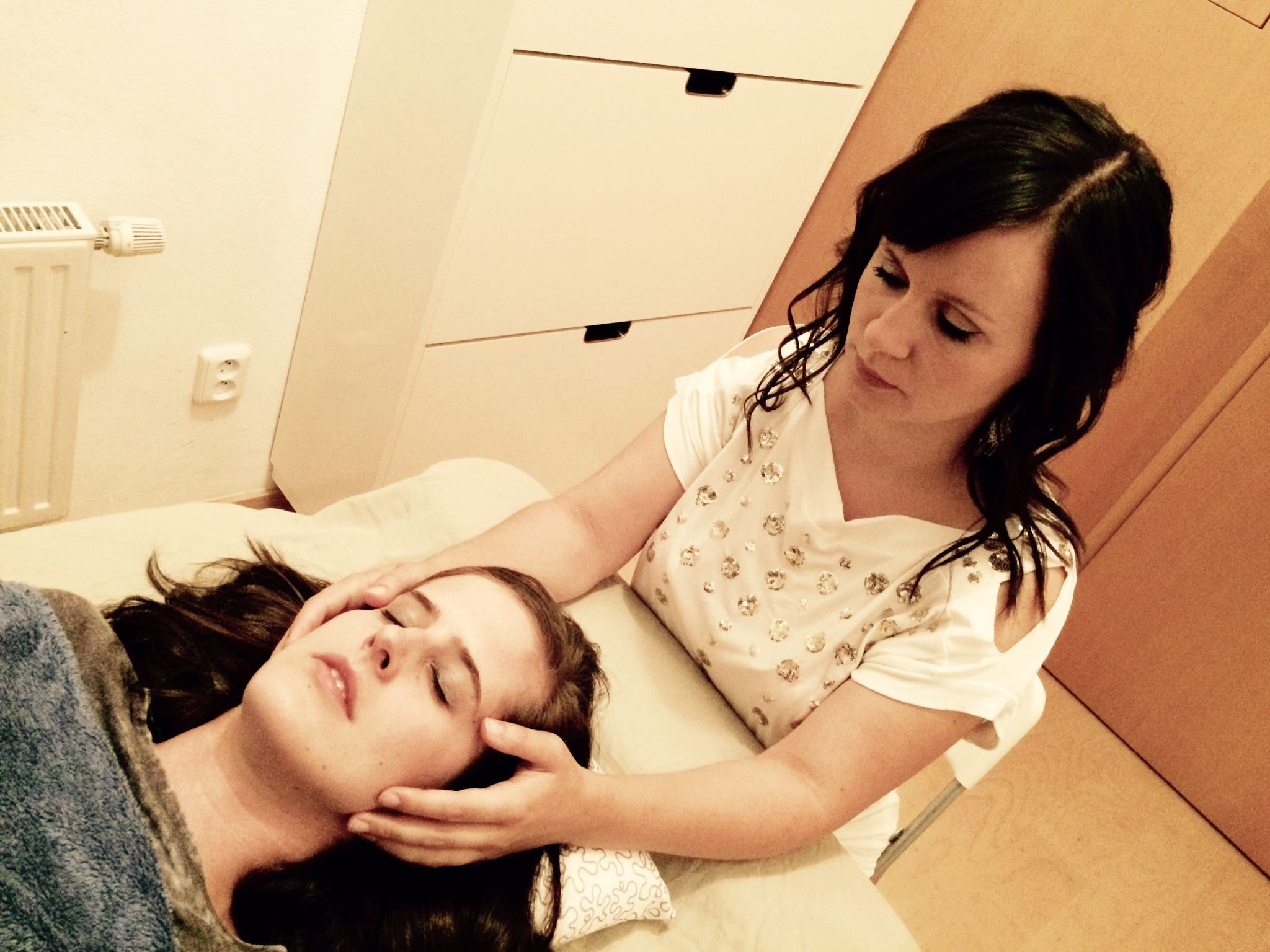
- Craniosacral therapy

Alternative therapy
- NCCIH Classification: Manipulation and body-based
- School: Osteopathy

Craniosacral therapy (CST) or cranial osteopathy is a form of alternative medicine that uses gentle touch to feel non-existent rhythmic movements of the skull's bones and supposedly adjust the immovable joints of the skull to achieve a therapeutic result. CST is a pseudoscience and its practice has been characterized as quackery. It is based on fundamental misconceptions about the anatomy and physiology of the human skull and is promoted as a cure-all for a variety of health conditions.

Medical research has found no significant evidence that either CST or cranial osteopathy confers any health benefit, and attempts to manipulate the bones of the skull can be harmful, particularly for children or infants. The basic assumptions of CST are not true, and practitioners produce conflicting and mutually exclusive diagnoses of the same patients.

== Effectiveness and safety ==
Practitioners of CST claim it is effective in treating a wide range of conditions, sometimes claiming it is a cancer cure, or a cure-all. Practitioners particularly advocate the use of CST on children, including on infants for colic. The American Cancer Society cautions that CST should never be used on children under age two. Pediatricians have expressed concern at the harm CST can cause to children and infants.

There is no evidence that CST is of use for people with autism and its use is potentially harmful. As of 2018 at least two deaths had been reported resulting from CST spinal manipulation. In a small study, participants with head injuries suffered worsening symptoms as a result of CST. Additionally, if used as the sole treatment for serious health conditions, choosing CST can have serious adverse consequences; the American Cancer Society recommends those with cancer or chronic conditions should consult their doctor before starting any therapy consisting of manual manipulation.

According to the American Cancer Society, although CST may relieve the symptoms of stress or tension, "available scientific evidence does not support claims that craniosacral therapy helps in treating cancer or any other disease". Cranial osteopathy has received a similar assessment, with one 1990 paper finding there was no scientific basis for any of the practitioners' claims the paper examined.

The evidence base for CST is sparse and lacks a demonstrated biologically plausible mechanism. In the absence of rigorous, well-designed randomized controlled trials, it is a pseudoscience, and its practice quackery. Tests show that CST practitioners cannot in fact identify the purported craniosacral pulse, and different practitioners will get different results for the same patient. The idea of a craniosacral rhythm cannot be scientifically supported.

=== Systematic reviews ===
In October 2012, Edzard Ernst conducted a systematic review of randomized clinical trials of craniosacral therapy. He concluded that "the notion that CST is associated with more than non-specific effects is not based on evidence from rigorous randomised clinical trials." Commenting specifically on this conclusion, Ernst wrote on his blog that he had chosen the wording as "a polite and scientific way of saying that CST is bogus." Ernst also remarked that the quality of five of the six trials he had reviewed was "deplorably poor," a sentiment that echoed an August 2012 review that noted the "moderate methodological quality of the included studies."

Ernst criticized a 2011 systematic review performed by Jakel and von Hauenschild for including observational studies and including studies with healthy volunteers. This review concluded that the evidence base surrounding craniosacral therapy and its efficacy was sparse and composed of studies with heterogeneous design. The authors of this review stated that currently available evidence was insufficient to draw conclusions.

A 2019 systematic review found limited evidence that CST may bring some relief for up to six months for people with chronic pain. However, the conclusions of this study were disputed by the Office for Science and Society at McGill University due to the poor methodological quality of the individual studies that made up the analysis.

=== Regulation ===
Edzard Ernst wrote that in 2005 in the United Kingdom, a foundation of then-Prince Charles issued a booklet listing CST as one of several popular alternative therapies, but admitted that the therapy was unregulated and lacked either a defined training program or the oversight of a professional body. Ernst wrote that this makes the therapists practising CST "less regulated than publicans."

== History ==
Cranial osteopathy, a forerunner of CST, was devised in the 1930s by William Garner Sutherland. While looking at a disarticulated skull, Sutherland was struck by the idea that the cranial sutures of the temporal bones where they meet the parietal bones were "beveled, like the gills of a fish, indicating articular mobility for a respiratory mechanism."

CST was invented by John Upledger, as an offshoot of cranial osteopathy. From 1975 to 1983, Upledger and neurophysiologist and histologist Ernest W. Retzlaff worked at Michigan State University as clinical researchers and professors. They assembled a research team to investigate the purported pulse and further study Sutherland's theory of cranial bone movement. Later, independent reviews of these studies concluded that they presented no good evidence for the effectiveness of craniosacral therapy or the existence of the proposed cranial bone movement.

== Conceptual basis ==
Practitioners of both cranial osteopathy and CST assert that there are small, rhythmic motions of the cranial bones attributed to cerebrospinal fluid pressure or arterial pressure. The premise of CST is that palpation of the cranium can be used to detect this rhythmic movement of the cranial bones and selective pressures may be used to manipulate the cranial bones to achieve a therapeutic result. However, there is no evidence that the bones of the human skull can be moved by such manipulations.

The fundamental concepts of cranial osteopathy and CST are inconsistent with the human skull, brain, and spine's known anatomy and physiology. Edzard Ernst has written "to anyone understanding a bit of physiology, anatomy etc. [CST] looks like pure nonsense."

In common with many other varieties of alternative medicine, CST practitioners believe all illness is caused by energy or fluid blockages which can be released by physical manipulation. They believe that the bones of the skull move in a rhythmic pattern which they can detect and correct.

The therapist lightly palpates the patient's body, and focuses intently on the communicated movements. A practitioner's feeling of being in tune with a patient is described as entrainment.

Comparing CST to cranial osteopathy, Upledger wrote: "Dr. Sutherland's discovery regarding the flexibility of skull sutures led to the early research behind CranioSacral Therapy– and both approaches affect the cranium, sacrum and coccyx– the similarities end there." However, modern-day cranial osteopaths largely consider the two practices to be the same, but that cranial osteopathy has "been taught to non-osteopaths under the name CranialSacral therapy."
