= James Cyriax =

British medical doctor

- Dr. James Cyriax, date unknown
- Born: 27 October 1904; London
- Died: 17 June 1985 (aged 80)
- Occupation: Doctor
- Known for: Orthopedic Medicine
- Family: Edgar Ferdinand Cyriax (father); Jonas Kellgren (cousin)

James Henry Cyriax (27 October 1904 – 17 June 1985) was a British medical doctor known as the "father of orthopedic medicine." His work is influential in the areas of sports medicine and physical therapy.

The son of two doctors, Edgar Ferdinand Cyriax and Annjuta (Anna) Kellgren, he qualified for membership and licentiate of the Royal College of Surgeons of England in 1929 and was appointed house surgeon of orthopedic surgery at St. Thomas' Hospital in London, where he worked for 40 years. He went on to develop a system of clinical exams to diagnose and treat soft tissue lesions, indicated by assessing body movements; this was his most well-known contribution to medicine. In 1943, he earned the Heberden prize for his essay on the pathology and treatment of elbow sprains. He founded the Association of Manipulative Medicine and later the Cyriax Foundation, which has since shut down, to promote orthopedic medical education.

He was appointed a Member of the Royal College of Physicians in 1954. Later in his career, he was a visiting professor at the University of Rochester in the United States. He was considered a controversial figure during his lifetime both for his personality and his views on medicine.

Cyriax developed a series of simple objective clinical exams that would effectively diagnose soft tissue musculoskeletal lesions. His collected results, after many years of trial and error, coalesced into a set of systematic simple clinical exams for each joint and a treatment system for the soft tissue lesions around each joint. Cyriax's Rule states that pain with both active range of motion and passive range of motion in the same direction points to inert tissue dysfunction (ligament, capsular, cartilage). Pain with active range of motion in one direction and pain with passive range of motion in the opposite direction signal contractile tissue dysfunction.

Cyriax's papers are held at the Wellcome Library.
