= Costoxiphoid ligaments =

Ligaments of the ribs and sternum

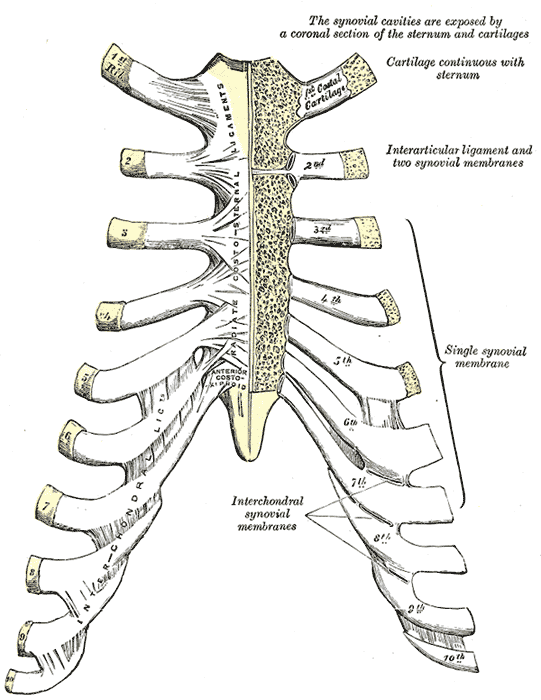
- Sternocostal and interchondral articulations. Anterior view.

Details

Identifiers
- Latin: ligamenta costoxiphoidea
- TA98: A03.3.05.005
- TA2: 1734
- FMA: 71397

The costoxiphoid ligaments (chondroxiphoid ligaments) are inconstant strand-like fibrous bands that connect the anterior and posterior surfaces of the seventh costal cartilage, and sometimes those of the sixth, to the front and back of the xiphoid process the sternum.

They vary in length and breadth in different subjects; those on the back of the joint are less distinct than those in front.
