= Intraarticular sternocostal ligament =

Ligament of the rib and sternum

Details
- From: Costal cartilage
- To: Manubrium, sternum

Identifiers
- Latin: ligamentum sternocostale intraarticulare
- TA98: A03.3.05.002
- TA2: 1731
- FMA: 8744

The intraarticular sternocostal ligament is a horizontal fibrocartilaginous plate in the center of the second sternocostal joint. It connects the tip of the costal cartilage to the fibrous junction between the manubrium and the body of the sternum, dividing the joint into two parts.
