= Right border of heart =

Part of the heart

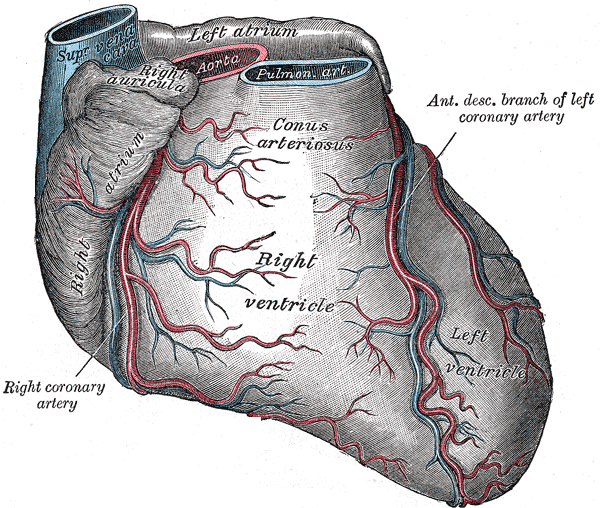
- Sternocostal surface of heart. (Right margin visible but not labeled.)

Details

Identifiers
- Latin: margo dexter cordis
- TA2: 3938
- FMA: 75134

The right border of the heart (right margin of heart) is a long border on the surface of the heart, and is formed by the right atrium.

- The atrial portion is rounded and almost vertical; it is situated behind the third, fourth, and fifth right costal cartilages about 1.25 cm. from the margin of the sternum.
- The ventricular portion, thin and sharp, is named the acute margin; it is nearly horizontal, and extends from the sternal end of the sixth right coastal cartilage to the apex of the heart.
