= Anterior cutaneous nerve entrapment syndrome =

Chronic abdominal pain due to ingrowth of thoracic nerves into abdominal muscles

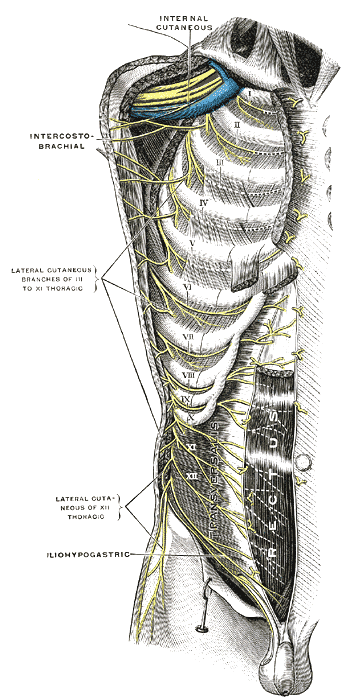
- Intercoastal nerves (anatomy)
- Specialty: Neurology

Anterior cutaneous nerve entrapment syndrome (ACNES) is a nerve entrapment condition that causes chronic pain of the abdominal wall. It occurs when nerve endings of the lower thoracic intercostal nerves (7–12) are 'entrapped' in abdominal muscles, causing a severe localized nerve (neuropathic) pain that is usually experienced at the front of the abdomen.

ACNES is frequently overlooked and unrecognized, although the incidence is estimated to be 1:2000 patients.

The relative unfamiliarity with this condition often leads to significant diagnostic delays and misdiagnoses, often resulting in unnecessary diagnostic interventions and futile procedures. Physicians often misdiagnose ACNES as irritable bowel syndrome or appendicitis as symptoms of the condition are not unique to this syndrome.

== Signs and symptoms ==
Affected individuals typically experience limited relief from standard pain relieving medication, with the exception of some neuroleptic agents. Patients frequently experience pseudo-visceral symptoms, including nausea, bloating, abdominal swelling, and loss of appetite, with consecutively lowered body weight or an altered defecation process.

Pain is typically related to tensing the abdominal wall muscles, so any type of movement is prone to aggravate pain. Lying quietly can be the least painful position. Most patients report that they cannot sleep on the painful side.

== Cause ==
In terms of etiology we find that it is due to the entrapment of cutaneous end branches of intercostal nerve in muscular foramen. This in turn causes ischemic neuropathy.

== Diagnosis ==
Once ACNES is considered based on the patient's history, the diagnosis can be made via a thorough physical examination: looking for a painful spot, which worsens by tensing the abdominal muscles with lifting the head and straightened legs (Carnett's sign). Almost always, a small area of maximal pain is covered by a larger area of altered skin sensibility with somatosensory disturbances such as hypoesthesia as well as hyperesthesia or hyperalgesia and change of cool perception. Pinching the skin between thumb and index finger is extremely painful compared to the opposite non-involved side.

Confirmation of a diagnosis of ACNES is warranted using an abdominal wall infiltration with a local anesthetic agent near the painful spot.

== Treatment ==
Treatment consists of several such anesthetic injections, sometimes combined with corticosteroids. Such an approach yields persistent pain relief in two-thirds of patients. This beneficial effect on pain has been demonstrated in a prospective double blind trial. The physical volume of the injection may also break apart the adhesions or fibrosis responsible for the entrapment symptoms.

Patients who do not respond to a stratagem of repetitive local trigger point injections can be offered a surgical approach. Terminal branches of an intercostal nerve are removed at the level of the anterior sheath of the rectus abdominal muscle ('anterior neurectomy'). Several larger series demonstrated a successful response in approximately two out of three patients, which was confirmed in another prospective double blind surgical trial: 73% of the patients who underwent a neurectomy were pain free, compared to 18% in the non-nerve resected group. Patients not responding to an anterior neurectomy, or those in whom the pain syndrome recurs after an initial pain free period (10%) may choose to undergo secondary surgery. This involves a repeated exploration combined with a posterior neurectomy. This procedure has been shown to be beneficial in 50% of cases.

== Epidemiology ==
This syndrome is predominantly found in young women, but may occur in both sexes and all age groups.
