= Lumbocostal ligament =

Ligament of the rib and spine

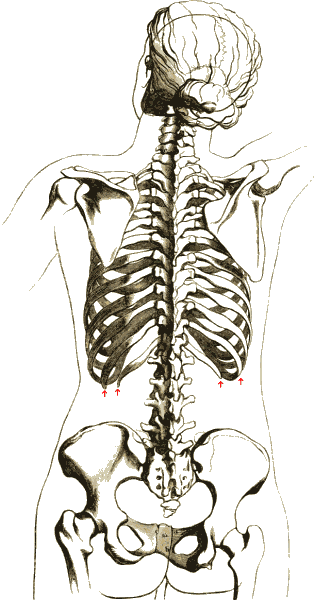
- The four floating ribs (indicated with red arrows)

Details
- From: twelfth rib
- To: lumbar vertebrae

Identifiers
- Latin: ligamentum lumbocostale
- TA98: A03.3.04.009
- TA2: 1728
- FMA: 8960

The lumbocostal ligament is a fibrous band that crosses from the twelfth rib to the tips of the transverse processes of the first and second lumbar vertebrae.
