= Edgar Ferdinand Cyriax =

English-Swedish orthopedic physician and physiotherapist (1874–1955)

- Born: 28 February 1874; London, England
- Died: 19 February 1955 (aged 80)
- Known for: Slipping rib syndrome
- Relatives: Annjuta Kellgren (wife), James Henry Cyriax (son), Anna Violet Cyriax (daughter), Mary Elizabeth Cyriax (daughter)
- Medical career
- Profession: Physician

Edgar Ferdinand Cyriax (28 February 1874 - 19 February 1955) was an English-Swedish orthopedic physician and physiotherapist from London, United Kingdom. He is known for his work in gymnastics, manipulative treatment, and the first written description of slipping rib syndrome.

== Biography ==
Edgar Ferdinand Cyriax was born in Canonbury, London on 28 February 1874 to Julius Friedrich Theodor Cyriax, from Germany, and Anna Lina Antonia Romana Eckenstein.

In 1899, Cyriax married Annjuta (Anna) Kellgren, daughter of Jonas Henrik Kellgren, Cyriax's mentor. Together they had James Cyriax, Anna Violet Cyriax, and Mary Elizabeth Cyriax.

Cyriax obtained his medical degree at Edinburgh University in 1901, then later graduated from the Kungliga Gymnastika Central Institut in Stockholm, Sweden.

He founded the North American Academy of Manipulative Medicine together with James Mennell. The first written description of slipping rib syndrome was described by Cyriax in 1919, who called it "Cyriax syndrome".

He was 80 years old when he died on February 19, 1955, in London, England. After his death, Cyriax's collection of notes, writings, and journals of gymnastics and manipulative treatment were donated to the Wellcome Library by his family.

== Bibliography ==
- The elements of Kellgrens Manual Treatment. New York: W. Wood and Co., 1904.
- Bibliographia gymnastica medica. 1909.
- Some new facts in the anatomy of certain movements. Journal of Anatomy, London, 1917, 51: 396-399.
- On various conditions that may simulate the referred pains of visceral disease, and a consideration of these from the point of view of cause and effect. 1919, 102: 314-322.
- On "Concentrating" and "Centrifugal" Vibrations. 1920, 93(4): 165-171.
- On the rotary movement of the wrist. Journal of Anatomy, 1926, 60: 199-201. PMCID: PMC5925686
- Minor displacements of the sacro-iliac joints. The British Journal of Physical Medicine, London, 1934, 8: 191-193.
