= Costochondral joint =

Joints between the ribs and costal cartilage in the front of the rib cage

Costochondral articulations

Details

Identifiers
- Latin: articulationes costochondrales
- TA98: A03.3.06.001
- TA2: 1714
- FMA: 7956

The costochondral joints are the joints between the ribs and costal cartilage in the front of the rib cage. They are hyaline cartilaginous joints (i.e. synchondrosis or primary cartilagenous joint). Each rib has a depression shaped like a cup that the costal cartilage articulates with. There is normally no movement at these joints. Joints between costal cartilages of the sixth and ninth rib are plane synovial joints. Articulation between costal cartilage of the ninth rib and tenth rib is fibrous.

The lateral end of each costal cartilage is received into a depression in the sternal end of the rib, and the two are held together by the periosteum.
