= Compression belt =

A compression belt is a type of spinal brace worn around the waist and lower back that compresses the abdomen.

It centers the body's mass, and effectively decompresses the spine. As a result, the user experiences improved posture, core stability, lower back pain relief, and reduced spinal cord compression stress.
