= Lukas Tietze =

German politician (born 1998)

Member of the Landtag of Baden-Württemberg
- Incumbent
- Assumed office 11 May 2026
- Constituency: Ludwigsburg

Personal details
- Born: 1998 (age 27–28)
- Party: Christian Democratic Union

Lukas Tietze (born 1998) is a German politician who was elected member of the Landtag of Baden-Württemberg in 2026. He is the chairman of the Christian Democratic Union in Tamm.
