= Titz (surname) =

Titz is a German surname. Notable persons with this name include:

- Anton Ferdinand Titz (1742–1811), German composer, violin and viola d'amore player
- Christian Titz (born 1971), German professional football manager and former player
- Coretti Arle-Titz (1881–1951), American jazz, spiritual, and pop music singer
- Erich Kaiser-Titz (1875–1928), German stage and film actor
