= Balanced ligamentous tension =

Balanced ligamentous tension (also known as balanced ligamentous tension release, ligamentous articular strain, or simply BLT) is both an indirect and direct technique used in osteopathic manipulative medicine.

== History ==
The technique was reportedly invented by A.T. Still. It was later described by his students Rebecca Lippincott and William Garner Sutherland, who greatly expanded it. It was described in “Osteopathic Technique of William G. Sutherland,” which was published in the 1949 Year Book of Academy of Applied Osteopathy. According to Sutherland's model, all the joints in the body are balanced ligamentous articular mechanisms. The ligaments provide proprioceptive information that guides the muscle response for positioning the joint, and the ligaments themselves guide the motion of the articular components.

== Execution ==
The technique has many variants. The general prescription is to disengage and exaggerate the diagnosed somatic dysfunction. This is the indirect component. The practitioner then waits for a change in the palpatory quality of the structure being treated, i.e., a change in skin tension, temperature, or muscle tension. This is followed by a balancing stage in which the practitioner slowly brings the joint into the diagnosed restriction (the direct component).
