= Synchondrosis =

Hyaline cartilage joint of two bones

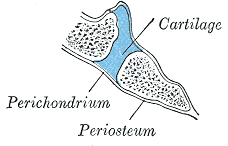
- Sagittal section through the clivus of the skull demonstrating the location of the spheno-occipital synchondrosis in an infant.

Identifiers
- TA98: A03.0.00.016
- TA2: 1529
- FMA: 7497

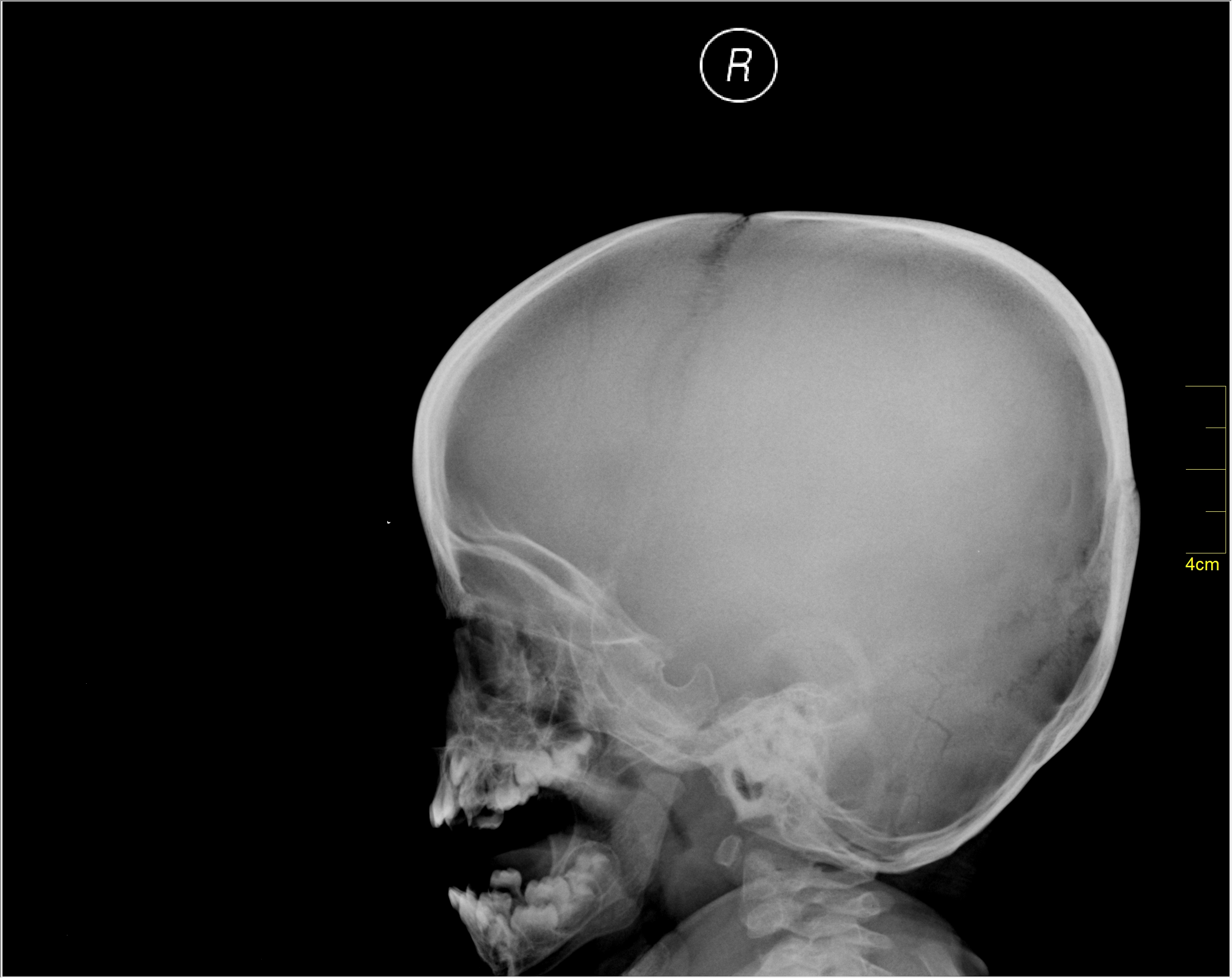
Lateral X-ray of a child's skull, showing the (radiolucent) spheno-occipital synchondrosis, forming the clivus.

A synchondrosis (or primary cartilaginous joint) is a type of cartilaginous joint where hyaline cartilage completely joins together two bones. Synchondroses are different from symphyses (secondary cartilaginous joints), which are formed of fibrocartilage, and from synostosis (ossified junctions), which is the fusion of two or more bones. Synchondroses are immovable joints and are thus referred to as synarthroses.are all synchondroses synarthrotic/immovable

== Examples in the human body ==
=== Permanent synchondroses ===
- first sternocostal joint (where first rib meets the manubrium of the sternum)
- petro-occipital synchondrosis

=== Temporary synchondroses (fuse during development) ===
- epiphyseal plates
- apophyses
- synchondroses in the developing hip bone composed of the ilium, ischium and pubis
- spheno-occipital synchondrosis
