= Radiate sternocostal ligaments =

Ligaments of the ribs and sternum

Details
- From: Sternum
- To: Costal cartilage

Identifiers
- Latin: ligamenta sternocostalia radiata
- TA98: A03.3.05.003
- TA2: 1732
- FMA: 9024 71396, 9024

The radiate sternocostal ligaments are fibrous bands that cross from the sternal end of the costal cartilage to the ventral part of the sternum.
