= Alexander Tietze =

German surgeon

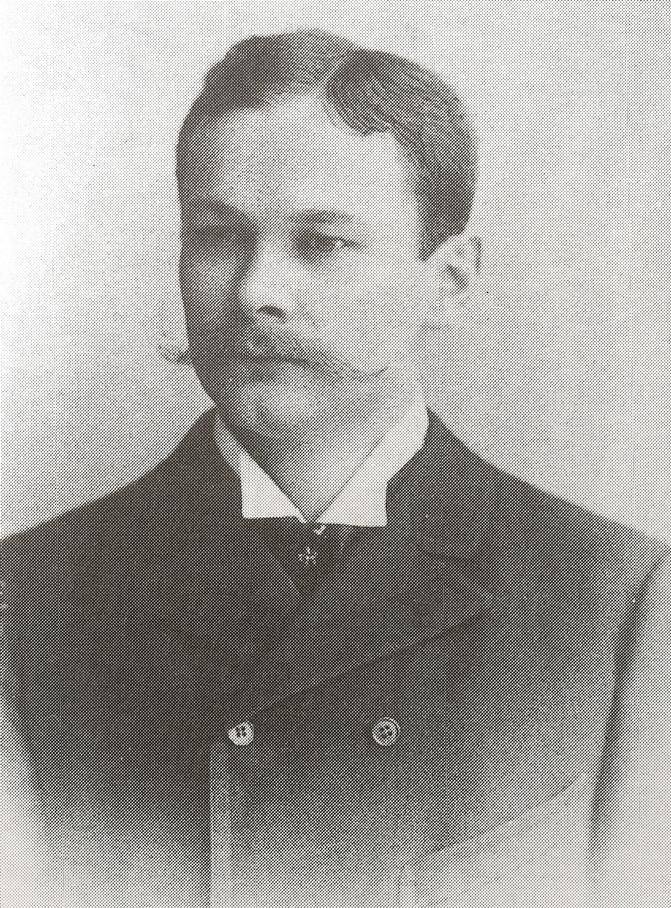
Alexander Tietze.

Alexander Tietze (6 February 1864 – 19 March 1927) was a German surgeon born in Liebenau. Tietze syndrome is named after him.

In 1887 he received his doctorate at the University of Breslau, and from 1888 to 1895 was an assistant at the Breslau surgical clinic. During this time period he worked under Jan Mikulicz-Radecki (1850-1905). In 1894 he gained his habilitation, subsequently becoming a primary physician at the Allerheiligen-Hospital (1896). In 1914-1920 he was a member of the Breslau City Council.

== Written works ==
Tietze's best known work was a highly regarded textbook on emergency surgery that was published in 1927 (year of his death).

- Die intrakraniellen Verletzungen der Gehirnnerven. Neue deutsche Chirurgie, volume 18, 2. Stuttgart, 1916.
- Dringliche Operationen. Neue deutsche Chirurgie, volume 32; Stuttgart, 1924.
- Die Chirurgie des Mastdarmes und des Afters. with R. Reichle, in: Martin Kirschner (1879-1942) and Otto Nordmann (1878-1946)- Die Chirurgie, volume 5. Berlin and Vienna, Urban & Schwarzenberg. 6 volumes in 9 parts, 1926–1930.
