= Self-limiting (biology) =

Natural limits on organisms or medical conditions

In biology and medicine, the term self-limiting may describe a medical condition, or it may describe an organism or colony.

== Self-limiting organisms and colonies ==
A self-limiting organism or colony of organisms limits its own growth by its actions. For example, a single organism may have a maximum size determined by genetics, or a colony of organisms may release waste which is ultimately toxic to the colony once it exceeds a certain population. In some cases, the self-limiting nature of a colony may be advantageous to the continued survival of the colony, such as in the case of parasites. If their numbers became too high, they would kill the host, and thus themselves. In other cases, self-limitation restricts the population of predators, reducing their impact on the long-term survival of rare species.

== Self-limiting medical conditions ==
When referring to a medical condition the term may imply that a condition would run its course without the need of external influence, especially any medical treatment. However, the fact that a condition may be self-limiting does not mean that medical treatment would not bring the condition or its symptoms to an end more quickly, or that such medical attention would be unnecessary in severe cases.
