= Cartilaginous joint =

Bodily joint connected entirely by cartilage

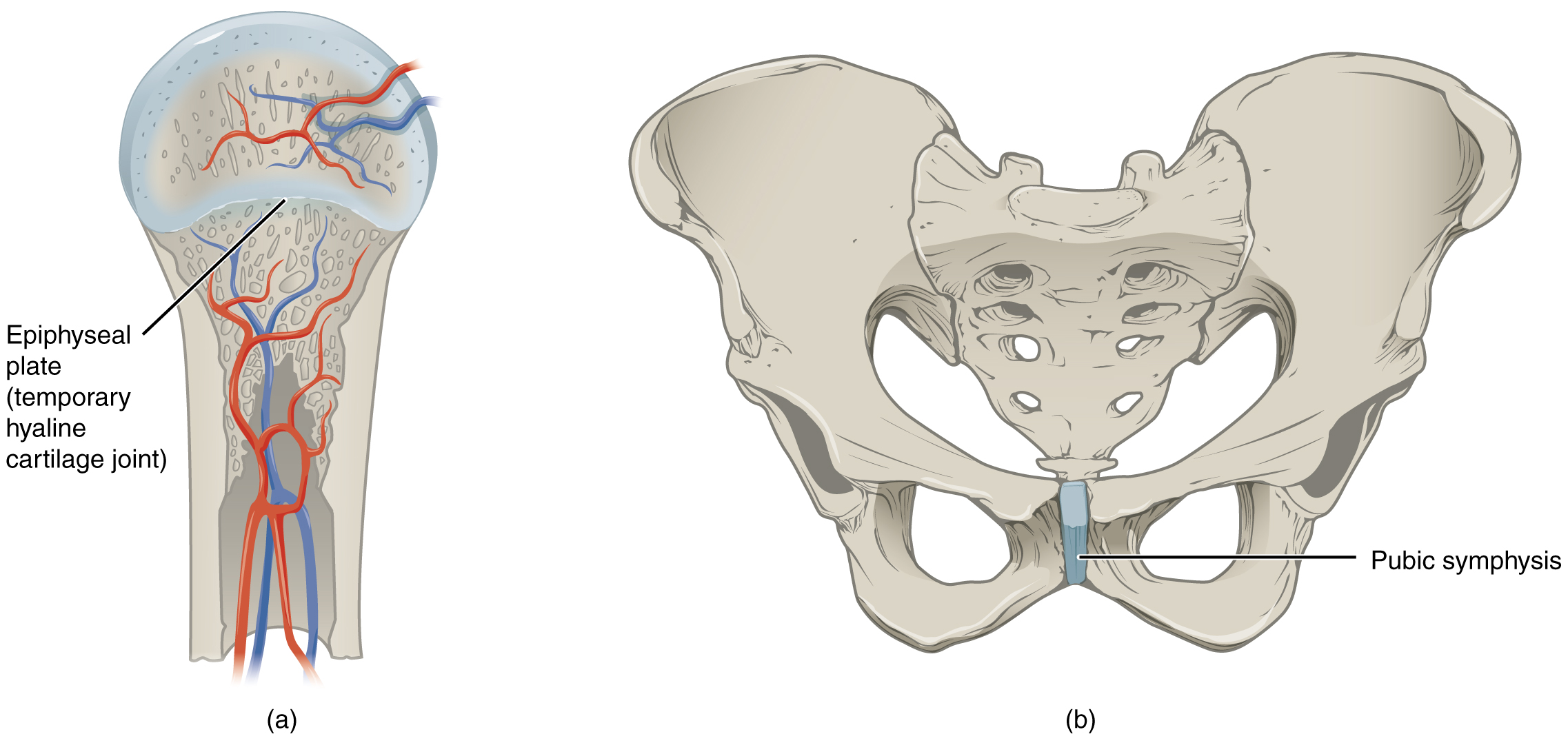
- Cartilaginous joints

Details

Identifiers
- Latin: junctura cartilaginea
- TA98: A03.0.00.015
- TA2: 1528
- FMA: 7496

Cartilaginous joints are connected entirely by cartilage (fibrocartilage or hyaline). Cartilaginous joints allow more movement between bones than a fibrous joint but less than the highly mobile synovial joint. Cartilaginous joints also forms the growth regions of immature long bones and the intervertebral discs of the spinal column.

== Primary cartilaginous joints ==
Primary cartilaginous joints are known as "synchondrosis". These bones are connected by hyaline cartilage and sometimes occur between ossification centers. This cartilage may ossify with age.

Some examples of primary cartilaginous joints in humans are the "growth plates" between ossification centers in long bones. These joints allow very little movement, such as in the spine or ribs.

== Secondary cartilaginous joints ==
Secondary cartilaginous joints are known as "symphysis". These include fibrocartilaginous and hyaline joints, which usually occur at the midline. Some examples of secondary cartilaginous joints in human anatomy would be the manubriosternal joint (between the manubrium and the body of the sternum), intervertebral discs, and the pubic symphysis. Articulating bones at a symphysis are covered with hyaline cartilage and have a thick, fairly compressible pad of fibrocartilage between them. Cartilaginous joints allow little movement, as summarized above.

The gap separating the bones at a symphysis may be narrow or wide. Examples in which the gap between the bones is narrow include the pubic symphysis and the manubriosternal joint. At the pubic symphysis, the pubic portions of the right and left hip bones of the pelvis are joined together by fibrocartilage across a narrow gap. Similarly, at the manubriosternal joint, fibrocartilage unites the manubrium and body portions of the sternum.

The intervertebral symphysis is a wide symphysis located between the bodies of adjacent vertebrae of the vertebral column. Here a thick pad of fibrocartilage called an intervertebral disc strongly unites the adjacent vertebrae by filling the gap between them. The width of the intervertebral symphysis is important because it allows for small movements between the adjacent vertebrae. In addition, the thick intervertebral disc provides cushioning between the vertebrae, which is important when carrying heavy objects or during high-impact activities such as running or jumping.

== Source text ==
This article incorporates text from a free content work. Licensed under CC BY 4.0. Text taken from Anatomy and Physiology, J. Gordon Betts et al, Openstax.
