= Costal cartilage =

Resilient, smooth, glass-like tissue at the front ends of ribs in vertebrates

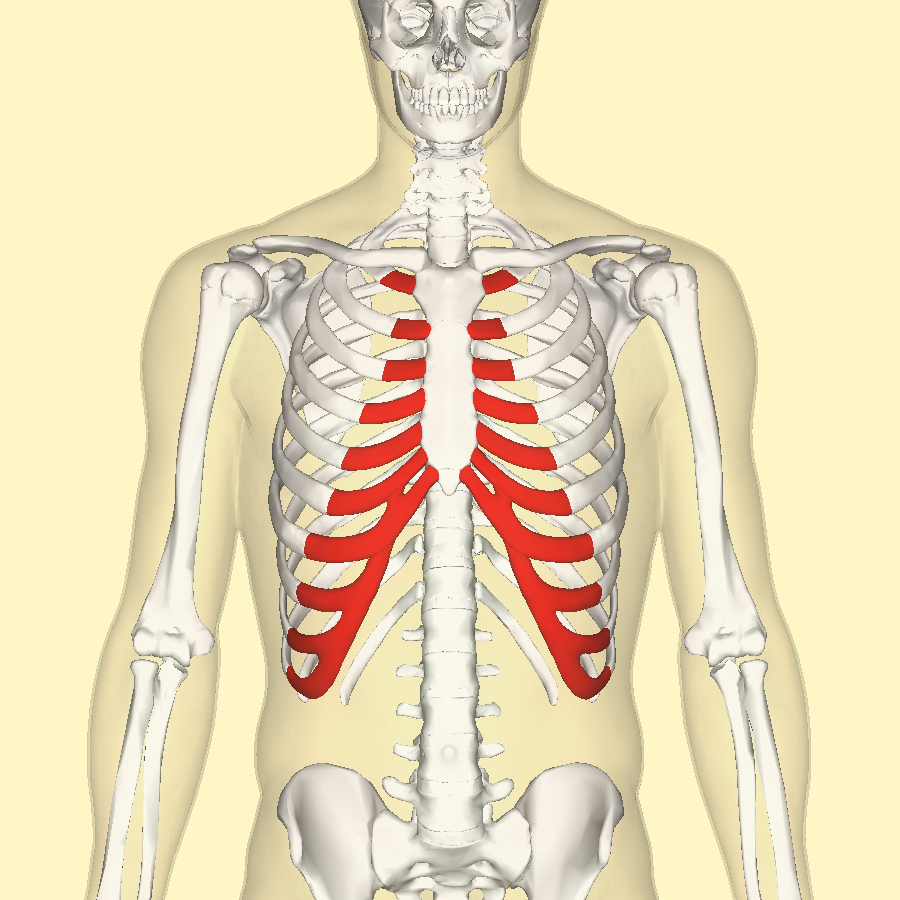
- Position of the costal cartilages (shown in red).

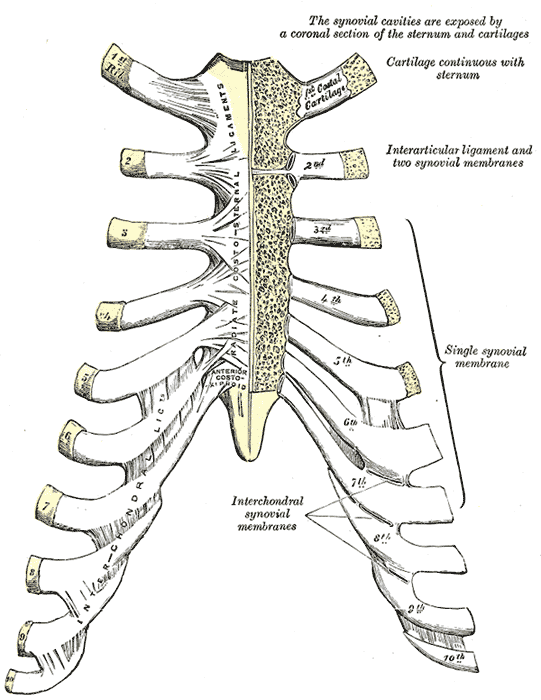
- Sternocostal and interchondral articulations. Anterior view.

Details

Identifiers
- Latin: cartilagines costales
- Greek: costo condrio
- MeSH: D066186
- TA98: A02.3.01.005
- TA2: 1140, 1139
- FMA: 7591

Costal cartilage, also known as rib cartilage, are bars of hyaline cartilage that serve to prolong the ribs forward and contribute to the elasticity of the walls of the thorax. Costal cartilage is only found at the anterior ends of the ribs, providing medial extension.

== Differences from ribs 1-12 ==
The first seven pairs are connected with the sternum; the next three are each articulated with the lower border of the cartilage of the preceding rib; the last two have pointed extremities, which end in the wall of the abdomen.

Like the ribs, the costal cartilages vary in their length, breadth, and direction. They increase in length from the first to the seventh, then gradually decrease to the twelfth.

Their breadth, as well as that of the intervals between them, diminishes from the first to the last. They are broad at their attachments to the ribs, and taper toward their sternal extremities, excepting the first two, which are of the same breadth throughout, and the sixth, seventh, and eighth, which are enlarged where their margins are in contact.

They also vary in direction: the first descends a little to the sternum, the second is horizontal, the third ascends slightly, while the others are angular, following the course of the ribs for a short distance, and then ascending to the sternum or preceding cartilage.

== Structure ==
Each costal cartilage presents two surfaces, two borders, and two extremities.

=== Surfaces ===
The anterior surface is convex, and looks forward and upward: that of the first gives attachment to the costoclavicular ligament and the subclavius muscle; those of the first six or seven at their sternal ends, to the pectoralis major. The others are covered by, and give partial attachment to, some of the flat muscles of the abdomen.

The posterior surface is concave, and directed backward and downward; that of the first gives attachment to the sternothyroideus, those of the third to the sixth inclusive to the transversus thoracis muscle, and the six or seven inferior ones to the transversus abdominis muscle and the diaphragm.

=== Borders ===
Of the two borders the superior is concave, the inferior convex; they afford attachment to the internal intercostals: the upper border of the sixth gives attachment also to the pectoralis major.

The inferior borders of the sixth, seventh, eighth, and ninth cartilages present heel-like projections at the points of greatest convexity. These projections carry smooth oblong facets which articulate with facets on slight projections from the upper borders of the seventh, eighth, ninth, and tenth cartilages, respectively.

=== Interchondral articulations ===
The interchondral articulations are the joints formed between the costal cartilages of the ribs. The contiguous borders of the sixth, seventh, and eighth, and sometimes those of the ninth and tenth, costal cartilages articulate with each other by small, smooth, oblong facets. Each articulation is enclosed in a thin articular capsule, lined by synovial membrane and strengthened laterally and medially by ligamentous fibers (interchondral ligaments) which pass from one cartilage to the other. Sometimes the fifth costal cartilages, more rarely the ninth and tenth, articulate by their lower borders with the adjoining cartilages by small oval facets; more frequently the connection is by a few ligamentous fibers.

=== Extremities ===
The lateral end of each cartilage is continuous with the osseous tissue of the rib to which it belongs.

The medial end of the first is continuous with the sternum; the medial ends of the six succeeding ones are rounded and are received into shallow concavities on the lateral margins of the sternum.

The medial ends of the eighth, ninth, and tenth costal cartilages are pointed, and are connected each with the cartilage immediately above.

Those of the eleventh and twelfth are pointed and free.

== Clinical significance ==
In people of old age, the costal cartilages are prone to superficial ossification, particularly in women with age of 50 years and over.

In costochondritis and Tietze syndrome, inflammation of the costal cartilage occurs. This is a common cause of chest pain.

Severe trauma may lead to fracture of the costal cartilage. Such injuries often go unnoticed during x-ray scans, but can be diagnosed with CT scans. Surgery is typically used to fix the costal cartilage back onto either the rib or sternum.

Costal cartilage may be harvested for reparative use elsewhere in the body. Whilst this is typically conducted using a general anaesthetic, IV sedation can also be used. The procedure presents a minor risk of pleural tear.

== Additional images ==
Position of the costal cartilages (shown in red). Animation.

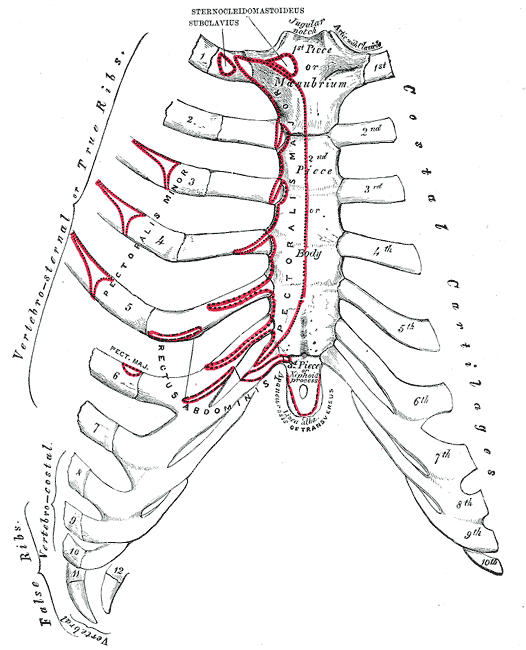
Anterior surface of sternum and costal cartilages.

== See also ==
- Costochondral joint
- Costochondritis
- Human rib cage
- Rib
