= Iliac spine =

The ilium is a bone of the pelvic girdle with four bony projections, each serving as attachment points for muscles and ligaments:

- Anterior superior iliac spine
- Anterior inferior iliac spine
- Posterior superior iliac spine
- Posterior inferior iliac spine
