= Anterior iliac spine =

Anterior iliac spine may refer to:

- Anterior superior iliac spine
- Anterior inferior iliac spine

== See also ==
- Iliac spine
