= Superior iliac spine =

Superior iliac spine may refer to:

- Anterior superior iliac spine
- Posterior superior iliac spine
