= Wing of ilium =

Flat portion of the hip bone

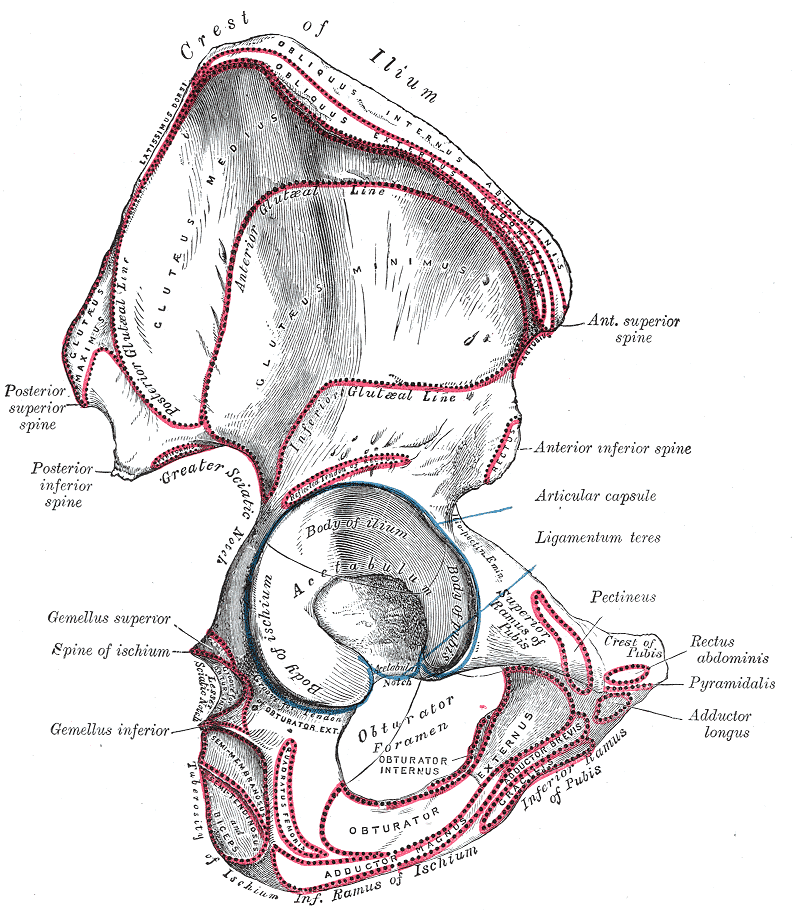
- Right hip bone. External surface.

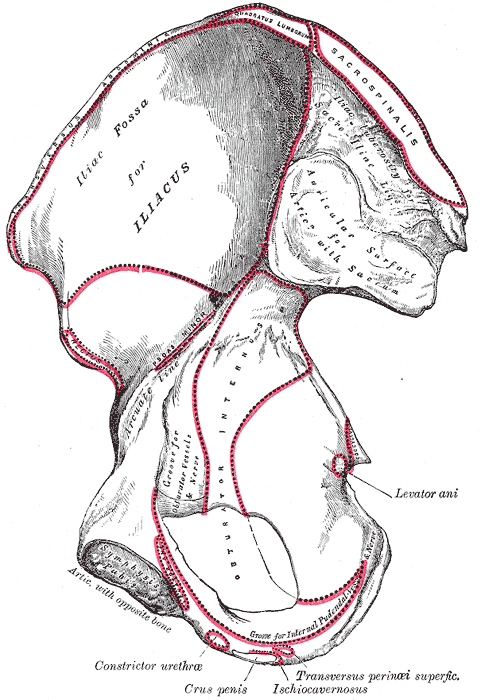
- Right hip bone. Internal surface.

Details

Identifiers
- Latin: ala ossis ilii
- TA98: A02.5.01.104
- TA2: 1321
- FMA: 42826

The wing (ala) of ilium is the large expanded portion of the ilium, the bone which bounds the greater pelvis laterally. It presents for examination two surfaces—an external and an internal—a crest, and two borders—an anterior and a posterior.

== External surface ==
The external surface, known as the dorsum ossis ilium, is directed backward and lateralward behind, and downward and lateralward in front.

It is smooth and its curvature changes from anteriorly convex to posteriorly deeply concave; bounded above by the crest, below by the upper border of the acetabulum, in front and behind by the anterior and posterior borders.

This surface is crossed in an arched direction by three lines—the posterior, anterior, and inferior gluteal lines.

The posterior gluteal line (superior curved line), the shortest of the three, begins at the crest, about 5 cm in front of its posterior extremity; it is at first distinctly marked, but as it passes downward to the upper part of the greater sciatic notch, where it ends, it becomes less distinct, and is often altogether lost.

Behind this line is a narrow semilunar surface, the upper part of which is rough and gives origin to a portion of the gluteus maximus; the lower part is smooth and has no muscular fibers attached to it.

The anterior gluteal line (middle curved line), the longest of the three, begins at the crest, about 4 cm behind its anterior extremity, and, taking a curved direction downward and backward, ends at the upper part of the greater sciatic notch.

The space between the anterior and posterior gluteal lines and the crest is concave, and gives origin to the gluteus medius.

Near the middle of this line a nutrient foramen is often seen.

The inferior gluteal line (inferior curved line), the least distinct of the three, begins in front at the notch on the anterior border, and, curving backward and downward, ends near the middle of the greater sciatic notch.

The surface of bone included between the anterior and inferior gluteal lines is concave from above downward, convex from before backward, and gives origin to the gluteus minimus.

Between the inferior gluteal line and the upper part of the acetabulum is a rough, shallow groove, from which the reflected tendon of the rectus femoris arises.

== Internal surface of the ala ==
The internal surface of the ala is bounded above by the crest, below, by the arcuate line; in front and behind, by the anterior and posterior borders.

It presents a large, smooth, concave surface, called the iliac fossa, which gives origin to the iliacus and is perforated at its inner part by a nutrient canal; and below this a smooth, rounded border, the arcuate line, which runs downward, forward, and medialward.

Behind the iliac fossa is a rough surface, divided into two portions, an anterior and a posterior. The anterior surface (auricular surface), so called from its resemblance in shape to the ear, is coated with cartilage in the fresh state, and articulates with a similar surface on the side of the sacrum.

The posterior portion, known as the iliac tuberosity, is elevated and rough, for the attachment of the posterior sacroiliac ligaments and for the origins of the sacrospinalis and multifidus.

Below and in front of the auricular surface is the preauricular sulcus, more commonly present and better marked in the female than in the male; to it is attached the pelvic portion of the anterior sacroiliac ligament.

== Crest of the ilium ==
The crest of the ilium is convex in its general outline but is sinuously curved, being concave inward in front, concave outward behind.

It is thinner at the center than at the extremities, and ends in the anterior and posterior superior iliac spines. The surface of the crest is broad, and divided into external and internal lips, and an intermediate line.

About 5 cm behind the anterior superior iliac spine there is a prominent tubercle on the outer lip.

To the external lip are attached the tensor fasciæ latæ, obliquus externus abdominis, and latissimus dorsi, and along its whole length the fascia lata; to the intermediate line the obliquus internus abdominis; to the internal lip, the fascia iliaca, the transversus abdominis, quadratus lumborum, sacrospinalis, and iliacus.

== Anterior border of the ala ==
The anterior border of the ala is concave. It presents two projections, separated by a notch.

Of these, the uppermost, situated at the junction of the crest and anterior border, is called the anterior superior iliac spine (ASIS); its outer border gives attachment to the fascia lata, and the tensor fasciae latae, its inner border, to the iliacus; while its extremity affords attachment to the inguinal ligament.

Beneath this eminence is a notch across which the lateral femoral cutaneous nerve passes. The sartorius muscle takes origin from the extremity of the ASIS and the upper part of this notch just underneath it.

Below the notch is the anterior inferior iliac spine (AIIS), which ends in the upper lip of the acetabulum; it gives attachment to the straight tendon of the rectus femoris and to the iliofemoral ligament of the hip-joint.

Medial to the anterior inferior spine is a broad, shallow groove, over which the iliacus and psoas major pass.

This groove is bounded medially by an eminence, the iliopectineal (also iliopubic) eminence, which marks the point of union of the ilium and pubis.

== Posterior border of the ala ==
The posterior border of the ala, shorter than the anterior, also presents two projections separated by a notch, the posterior superior iliac spine and the posterior inferior iliac spine.

The former serves for the attachment of the oblique portion of the posterior sacroiliac ligaments and the multifidus; the latter corresponds with the posterior extremity of the auricular surface.

Below the posterior inferior spine is a deep notch, the greater sciatic notch.
