= Posterior iliac spine =

Posterior iliac spine may refer to:

- Posterior superior iliac spine
- Posterior inferior iliac spine
