= Nelaton's line =

Theoritical line

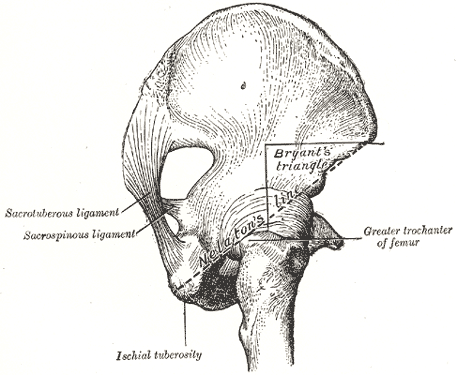
Nélaton's line and Bryant’s triangle.

In anatomy, the Nelaton's Line (also known as the Roser-Nélaton line) is a theoretical line, in the moderately flexed hip, drawn from the anterior superior iliac spine to the tuberosity of the ischium.

It was named for German surgeon and ophthalmologist Wilhelm Roser and French surgeon Auguste Nélaton.

== Clinical significance ==
Normally the greater trochanter of the femur lies below this line, but in cases of iliac joint dislocation of the hip or fracture of the neck of the femur the trochanter is felt above or in the line.

Though the line can be of help for diagnosis of fractures, its practical value is disputed.

== See also ==
- Hip fracture
