= Wilhelm Roser =

German surgeon and ophthalmologist

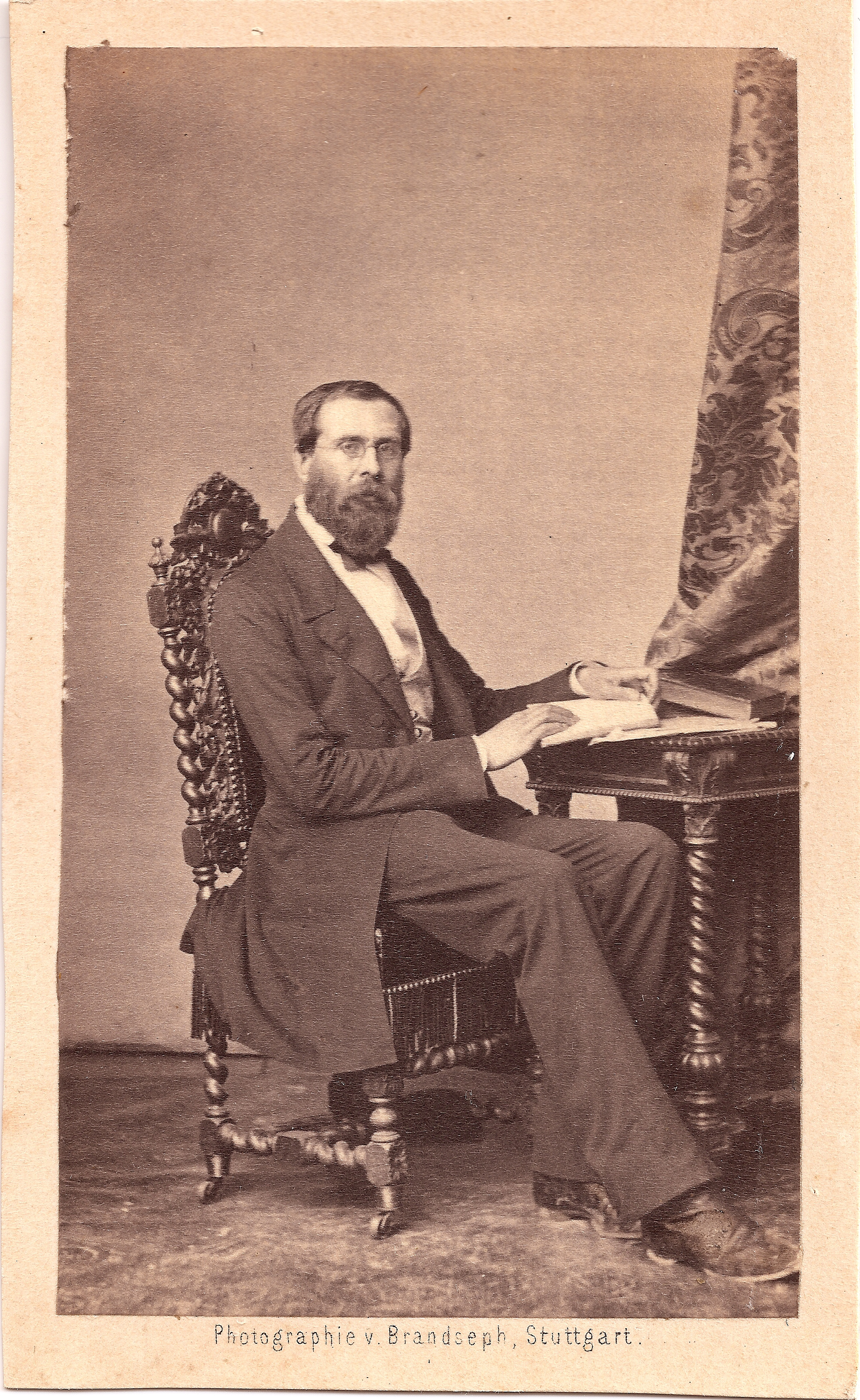
Roser (ca. 1862)

Wilhelm Roser (26 March 1817 – 16 December 1888) was a German surgeon and ophthalmologist. He was born in Stuttgart and died in Marburg.

In 1839 he received his medical doctorate from the University of Tübingen, and afterwards continued his education in Würzburg, Halle, Vienna and Paris. In 1841 he returned to Tübingen, where he was habilitated for surgery. In 1846 he practiced medicine in Reutlingen, and later succeeded Eduard Zeis (1807–1868) as professor of surgery at the University of Marburg. Roser would remain at Marburg for the remainder of his career.

With his lifelong friends, clinician Carl Wunderlich (1815–1877) and neurologist Wilhelm Griesinger (1817–1868), he founded a journal of physiological medicine titled Archiv für physiologische Heilkunde. He published over 150 medical papers, and was the author of Handbuch der anatomischen Chirurgie, a textbook on anatomical surgery that ran through eight editions, and was translated into French and English.

== Associated eponyms ==
- "Roser-König mouth gag": An oral implement used in medicine; named with German surgeon Franz König (1832–1910).
- "Roser-Nélaton line": A theoretical line drawn from the anterior superior iliac spine to the tuberosity of the ischium. Named with French surgeon Auguste Nélaton (1807–1873).
