= Injection fibrosis =

Complication of intramuscular injection

Injection fibrosis is a complication of intramuscular injection, occurring especially often in infants and children. Injections are often delivered to the quadriceps, triceps, and gluteal muscles, and thus the complication often manifests itself in those muscles.

Patients are unable to fully flex the affected muscle. The condition is painless, but progressively worsens over time. Orthopedic surgery is the typical treatment.

== See also ==
- Fibrosis
