= Inferior iliac spine =

Inferior iliac spine may refer to:

- Anterior inferior iliac spine
- Posterior inferior iliac spine
