= Bryant's triangle =

Surface landmark of knee

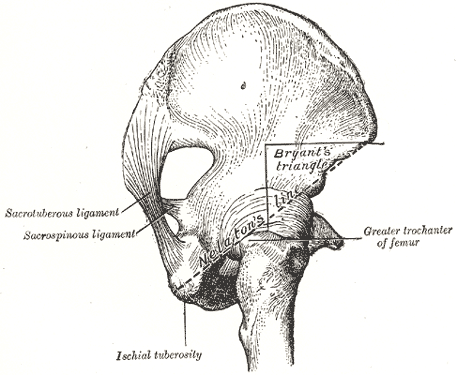
- Nélaton's line and Bryant's triangle.

A surface marking of clinical importance is Bryant's triangle (or iliofemoral triangle), which is mapped out thus:

- the hypotenuse of the right angled triangle is a line from the anterior superior iliac spine to the top of the greater trochanter.
- its sides are formed respectively by:
  - a vertical line from the anterior superior iliac spine
  - a perpendicular line from the top of the greater trochanter.
