= Pelvic lift =

Type of exercise

Pelvic lift (Source: Centers for Disease Control and Prevention, cdc.gov)

Pelvic lift (also known as pelvic tilt) is an exercise to strengthen the lower back, glute muscles, lower abdominal muscles, and maintain hip muscle balance. It does not require weights, although they can be placed on the stomach.

== Steps ==
There are four steps in the exercise.

- The person lies on their back with knees bent
- They slowly raise their buttocks and pelvis off the floor as high as possible
- Hold position
- Repeat

== Benefits ==
The pelvic floor is a "broad sling of muscles, ligaments, and sheet-like tissues that extend from the pubic bone at the front of the body to the base of the spine at the back". These structures are resistant to stretch and weight and normally return to their original shape. However, prolonged or repeated loading can cause them to become stretched over time.

Regular performance of this exercise can strengthen the gluteal, abdominal, and lower back muscles. For this reason, pelvic lifts may be recommended to help reduce lower back pain, improve posture, and support bladder control.
