= Gluteal lines =

Lines of the human ilium

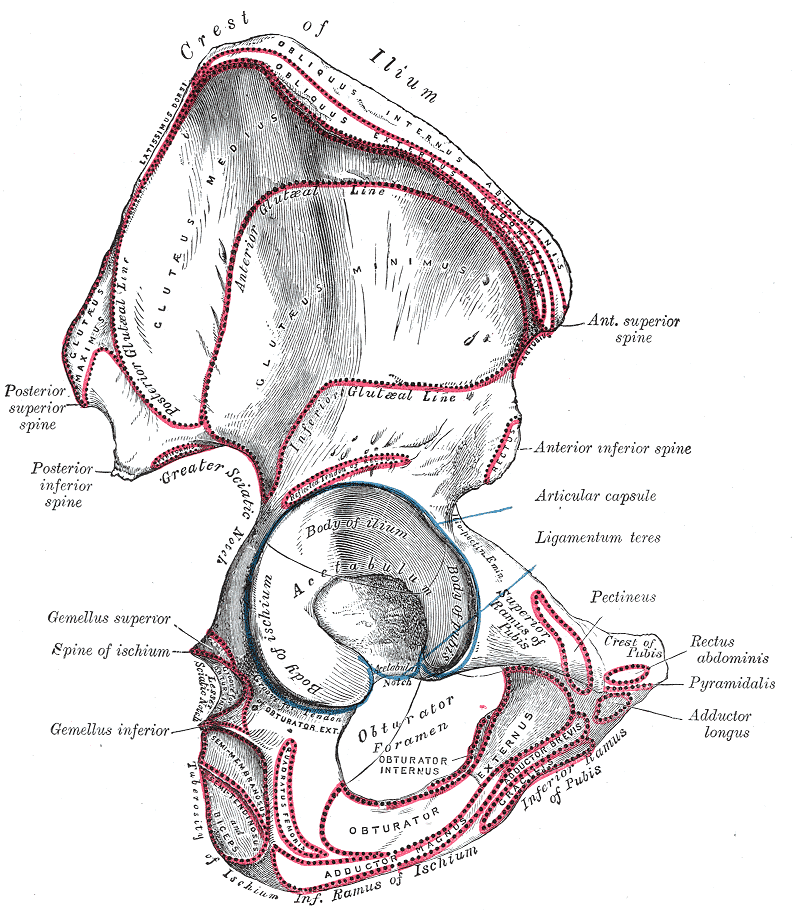
- Right hip bone. External surface. Posterior gluteal line is red arch near top, labeled at center left; inferior gluteal line is horizontal red line near center; anterior gluteal line is the third red line from the top.

Details

Identifiers
- Latin: lineae glutaea

The gluteal lines are three curved lines outlined from three bony ridges on the exterior surface of the ilium in the gluteal region. They are the anterior gluteal line; the inferior gluteal line, and the posterior gluteal line.

The gluteus minimus, medius, and maximus are muscles that arise from the gluteal lines.

== Location ==
=== Anterior gluteal line ===
The anterior gluteal line is the middle curved gluteal line on the hip bone. It is the longest of the three gluteal lines, begins at the iliac crest, about 4 cm. behind its anterior extremity, and, taking a curved direction downward and backward, ends at the upper part of the greater sciatic notch. The space between the anterior and posterior gluteal lines and the crest is concave, and gives origin to the gluteus medius muscle. Near the middle of this line a nutrient foramen is often seen.

=== Posterior gluteal line ===
Posterior gluteal line, also known as the superior curved line, the shortest of the three gluteal lines, begins at the iliac crest, about 5 cm in front of its posterior extremity; it is at first distinctly marked, but as it passes downward to the upper part of the greater sciatic notch, where it ends, it becomes less distinct, and is often altogether lost. Behind this line is a narrow semilunar surface, the upper part of which is rough and gives origin to a portion of the gluteus maximus muscle. The lower part is smooth, and has no muscular fibers attached to it.

=== Inferior gluteal line ===
The inferior gluteal line, is the least distinct of the three gluteal lines, begins in front at the notch on the anterior border, and, curving backward and downward, ends near the middle of the greater sciatic notch.

=== Associated muscles ===
The gluteal muscles all arise from the gluteal lines. The gluteus minimus is a fan-shaped convergent muscle, arising from the outer surface of the ilium, between the anterior and inferior gluteal lines, and behind, from the margin of the greater sciatic notch.

The gluteus medius muscle originates on the outer surface of the ilium between the iliac crest and the posterior gluteal line above, and the anterior gluteal line below; the gluteus medius also originates from the gluteal aponeurosis that covers its outer surface.

The gluteus maximus arises from the posterior gluteal line of the outer upper ilium, and the rough portion of bone including the crest, immediately above and behind it; from the posterior surface of the lower part of the sacrum and the side of the coccyx; from the aponeurosis of the erector spinae (lumbodorsal fascia), the sacrotuberous ligament, and the fascia covering the gluteus medius.
