= Posterior inferior iliac spine =

Anatomical landmark

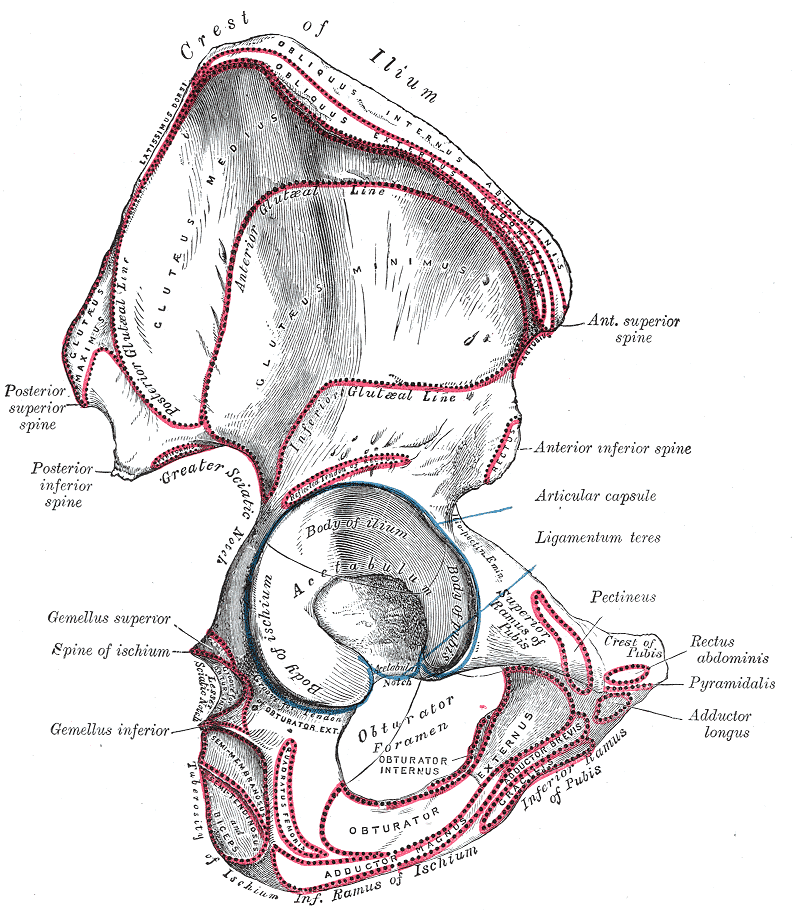
- Right hip bone. External surface. (Posterior inferior spine labeled at center left.)

Details

Identifiers
- Latin: spina iliaca posterior inferior
- TA98: A02.5.01.114
- TA2: 1330
- FMA: 63615

The posterior inferior iliac spine (Sweeney's Tubercle) is an anatomical landmark that describes a bony "spine", or projection, at the posterior and inferior surface of the iliac bone.

It is one of two such spines on the posterior surface, the other being the posterior superior iliac spine. These two spines are separated by a bony notch. They appear as two dimples in the skin, at the level of the lower back.

The posterior inferior iliac spine corresponds with the posterior extremity of the auricular surface.

== Additional images ==
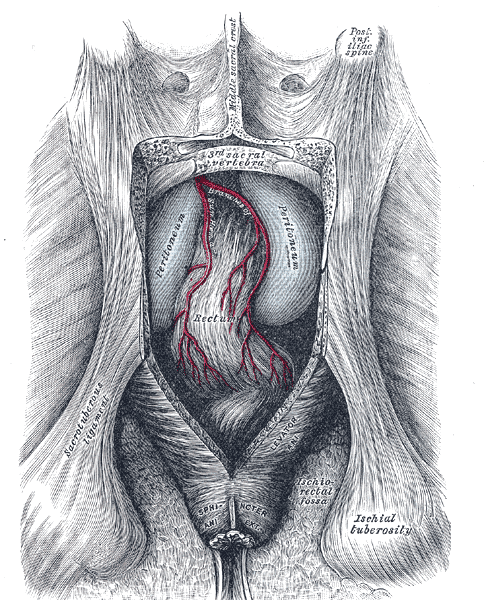
The posterior aspect of the rectum exposed by removing the lower part of the sacrum and the coccyx
