= Auguste Nélaton =

French physician and surgeon

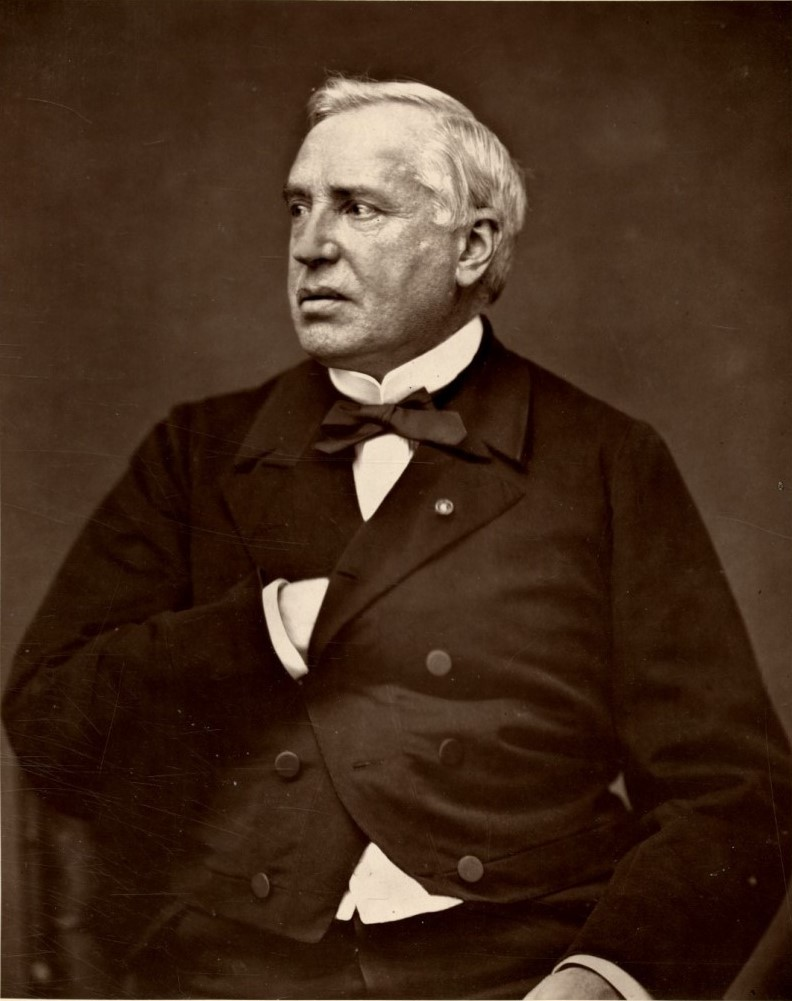
- Auguste Nélaton

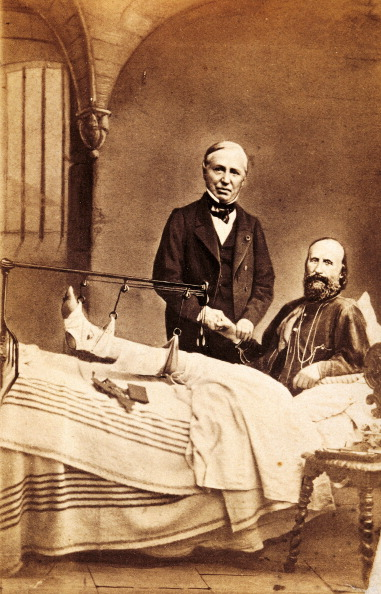
A fabricated image purporting to show Nélaton with Giuseppe Garibaldi in a hospital

Auguste Nélaton (17 June 1807 – 21 September 1873) was a French medical doctor and surgeon.

Born in Paris, he began studying medicine in 1828 and graduated as an MD in 1836 with a thesis on the effects of tuberculosis on the bones. Three years later, he became an agrégé at the Hôpital Saint-Louis after his publication of On the treatment of breast tumors. From 1851 to 1867, he was a full professor, a post he abandoned when he became the personal surgeon of Napoleon III. Ramón Emeterio Betances—Puerto Rican pro-independence leader, surgeon and Légion d'honneur laureate—was one of Nélaton's prominent students.

In 1867, Nélaton was elected a foreign member of the Royal Swedish Academy of Sciences.

In 1868, Nélaton was appointed Imperial Senator.

Nélaton worked in plastic surgery. He was the first to re-emphasize ligature of the two ends of arteries in hemorrhages first promoted by Ambroise Paré in the mid-16th century. He invented the porcelain-knobbed probe for locating bullets known as Nélaton's probe. The probe was used to locate a bullet in the ankle of Giuseppe Garibaldi in 1862. He also made noted contributions to pelvic and abdominal surgery.

Nélaton is also credited with the invention of the Nélaton catheter. A rubber catheter which was a great improvement and relieved patients of the distress of tour de maître (catheterization with stiff implements). He is also associated with improvements in lithotomy.

Nélaton died in Paris and is buried in Père Lachaise Cemetery.
