= Posterior superior iliac spine =

Part of the human hip bone

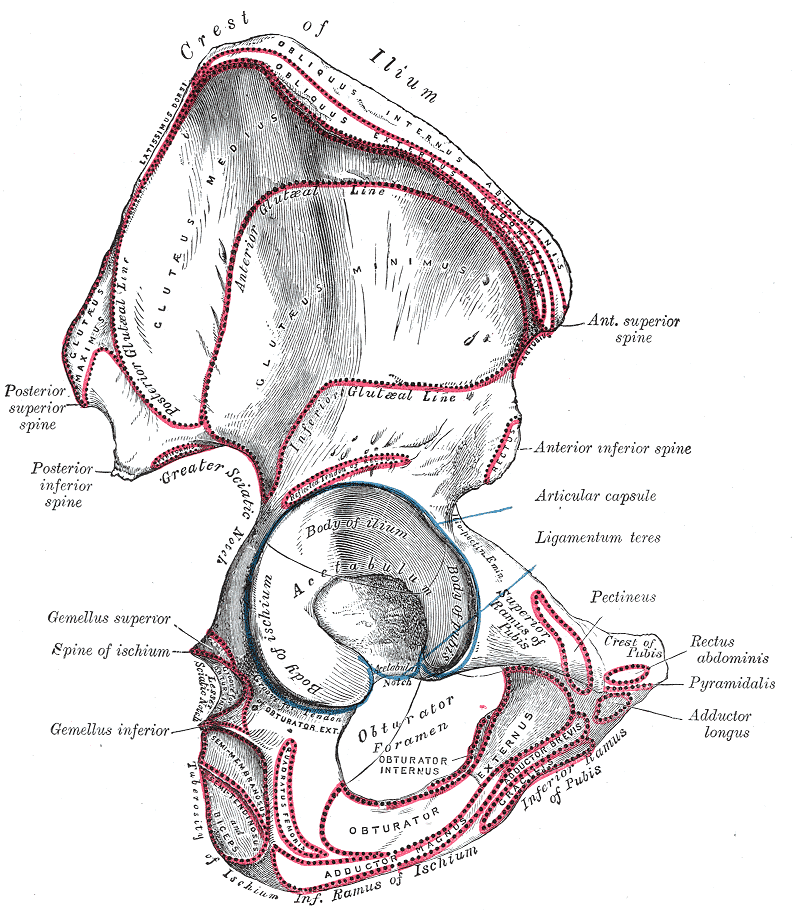
- Right hip bone. External surface. (Posterior superior spine labeled at center left.)

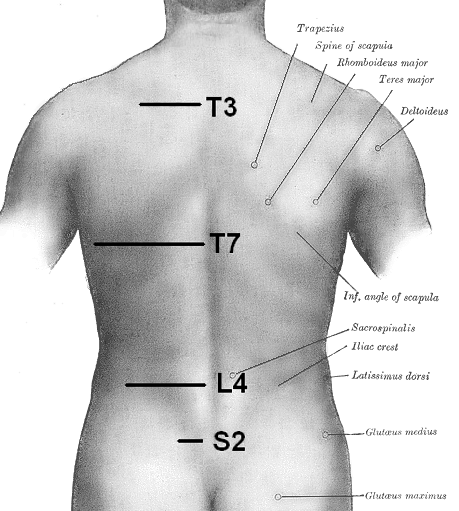
- Surface anatomy of the back. Posterior superior iliac spine lies in the marking of S2.

Details

Identifiers
- Latin: spina iliaca posterior superior
- TA98: A02.5.01.113
- TA2: 1329
- FMA: 49468

The posterior border of the ala of the ilium, shorter than the anterior, also presents two projections separated by a notch, the posterior superior iliac spine and the posterior inferior iliac spine. The posterior superior iliac spine serves for the attachment of the oblique portion of the posterior sacroiliac ligaments and the multifidus.

== See also ==
- Dimples of Venus
