= Ilium (bone) =

Uppermost and largest part of the hip bone

Ilium of pelvis
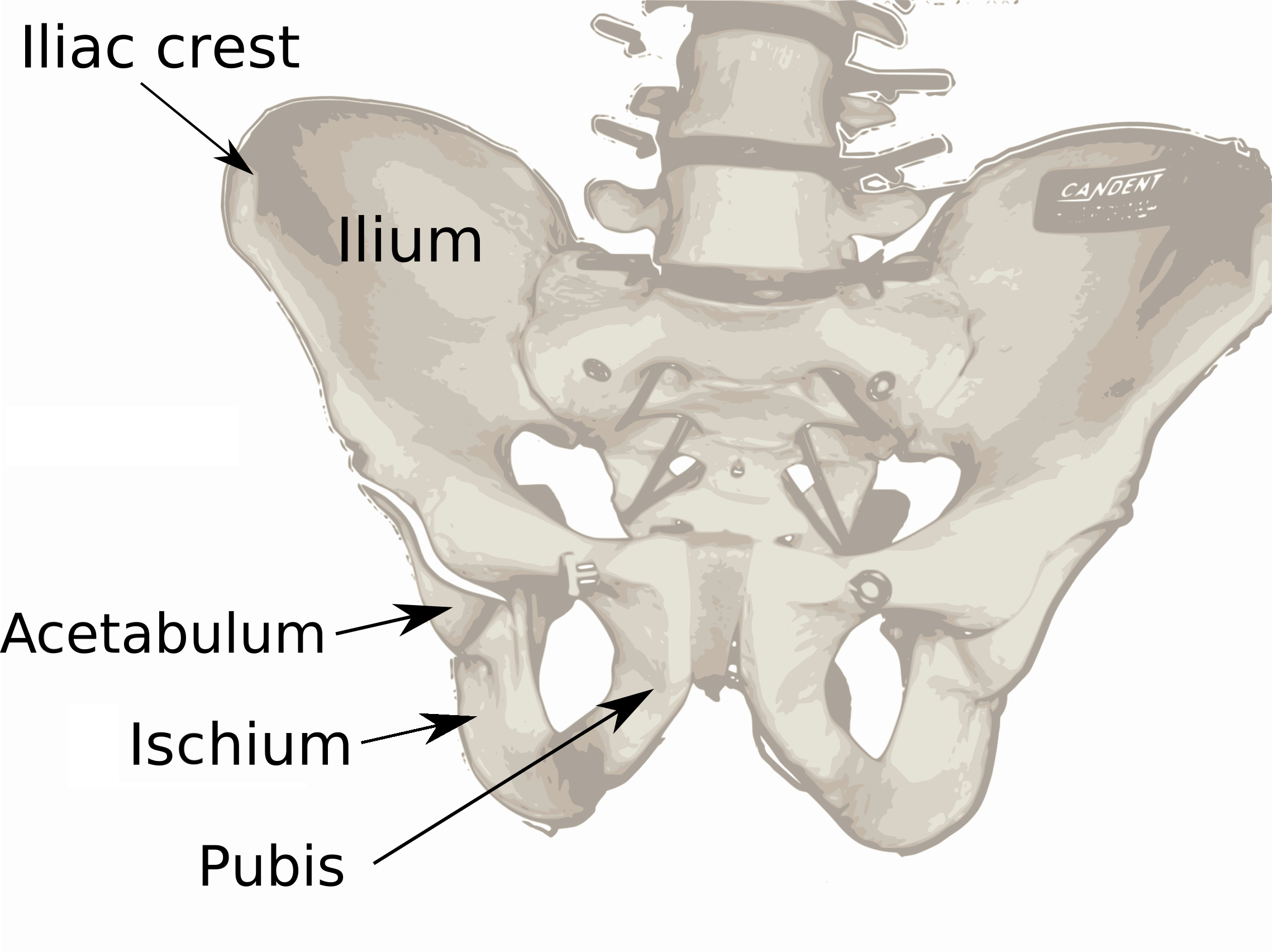
- Overview of Ilium as largest region of the pelvis.

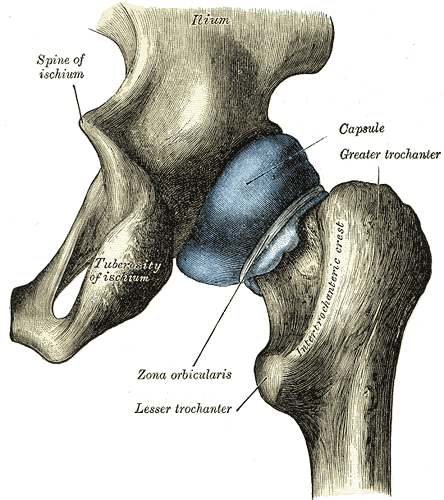
- Capsule of hip-joint (distended). Posterior aspect. (Ilium labeled at top.)

Details

Identifiers
- Latin: os ilium
- MeSH: D007085
- TA98: A02.5.01.101
- TA2: 1317
- FMA: 16589

The ilium (/ˈɪliəm/) (pl.: ilia) is the uppermost and largest region of the hip bone, and appears in most vertebrates including mammals and birds, but not bony fish. All reptiles have an ilium except snakes, with the exception of some snake species which have a tiny bone considered to be an ilium.

The ilium of the human is divisible into two parts, the body and the wing; the separation is indicated on the top surface by a curved line, the arcuate line, and on the external surface by the margin of the acetabulum.

The name comes from the Latin (ile, ilis), meaning "groin" or "flank".

== Structure ==
The ilium consists of the body and wing. Together with the ischium and pubis, to which the ilium is connected, these form the pelvic bone, with only a faint line indicating the place of union.

The body (Latin: corpus) forms less than two-fifths of the acetabulum; and also forms part of the acetabular fossa. The internal surface of the body is part of the wall of the lesser pelvis and gives origin to some fibers of the obturator internus.

The wing (Latin: ala) is the large expanded portion which bounds the greater pelvis laterally. It has an external and an internal surface, a crest, and two borders—an anterior and a posterior.

=== Biiliac width ===
In humans, biiliac width is an anatomical term referring to the widest measure of the pelvis between the outer edges of the upper iliac bones.

Biiliac width has the following common synonyms: pelvic bone width, biiliac breadth, intercristal breadth/width, bi-iliac breadth/width and biiliocristal breadth/width.

It is best measured by anthropometric calipers (an anthropometer designed for such measurement is called a pelvimeter). Attempting to measure biiliac width with a tape measure along a curved surface is inaccurate.

The biiliac width measure is helpful in obstetrics because a pelvis that is significantly too small or too large can have complications. For example, a large baby or a small pelvis often lead to death unless a caesarean section is performed.

It is also used by anthropologists to estimate body mass.

== Other animals ==
=== Dinosaurs ===
The clade Dinosauria is divided into the Saurischia and Ornithischia based on hip structure, including importantly that of the ilium. In both saurischians and ornithischians, the ilium extends laterally to both sides from the axis of the body. The other two hip bones, the ischium and the pubis, extend ventrally down from the ilium towards the belly of the animal. The acetabulum, which can be thought of as a "hip-socket", is an opening on each side of the pelvic girdle formed where the ischium, ilium, and pubis all meet, and into which the head of the femur inserts. The orientation and position of the acetabulum is one of the main morphological traits that caused dinosaurs to walk in an upright posture with their legs directly underneath their bodies. The brevis fossa is a deep groove in the underside of the postacetabular process, the rear part of the ilium. The brevis shelf is the bony ridge at the inner side of the fossa, the bone wall forming the internal face of the rear part of the ilium, which functions as an attachment area for a tail muscle, the musculus caudofemoralis brevis. Often, close to the hip-socket the lower edge of the outer face of the postacetabular process is positioned higher than the edge of the brevis shelf, exposing the latter in side view.

Ornithischian pelvic structure (left side)

Saurischian pelvic structure (left side).

== History ==
The 'English' name ilium as bone of the pelvis can be traced back to the writings of anatomists Andreas Vesalius, who coined the expression os ilium. In this expression ilium can be considered as the genitive plural of the nominative singular of the noun ile. Ile in classical Latin can refer to the flank of the body, or to the groin, or the part of the abdomen from the lowest ribs to the pubes. Ile is usually encountered as plural (ilia) in classical Latin. The os ilium can literally be translated as bone (Latin: os ) of the flanks.

More than a millennium earlier, the ossa ilium were described by the Greek physician Galen, and referred to as, with a quite similar expression, τά πλατέα λαγόνων ὀστᾶ, the flat bones of the flanks, with λαγών for flank. In anatomic Latin, the expression os lagonicum can also be found, based on Ancient Greek λαγών. In modern Greek, the nominalized adjective λαγόνιο is used to refer to the os ilium.

In Latin and Greek, it is not uncommon to nominalize adjectives, e.g. stimulantia from remedia stimulantia or ὁ ἐγκέφαλος from ὁ ἐγκέφαλος μυελός. The name ilium as used in English can not be considered as nominalized adjective derived from the full Latin expression os ilium, as ilium in this expression is a genitive plural of a noun and not a nominative singular of an adjective. The form ilium in English is however thought to be derived from the Latin word ilium, an orthographic variant in Latin of ile, flank or groin. Whereas the expression of Andreas Vesalius os ilium appropriately expresses bone of the flanks, the sole term ilium as used in English, lacks this precision and has to be literally translated as groin or flank.

There exists however in classical Latin an adjective ilius/ilia/ilium. This adjective however means not with respect to the flanks, but Trojan. Troy is referred to in classical Latin as Ilium, Ilion or Ilios and in ancient Greek as Ἴλιον or Ἴλιος.

The first editions of the official Latin nomenclature, Nomina Anatomica of the first 80 years (first in 1895) used the Vesalian expression os ilium. In the subsequent editions from 1983 and 1989, the expression os ilium was altered to os ilii. This latter expression supposes a genitive singular of the alternate noun ilium instead of a genitive plural of the noun ile. Quite inconsistently, in the 1983 edition of the Nomina Anatomica, the genitive plural of ile (instead of ilium) is still being used in such expressions as vena circumflexa ilium superficialis. In the current 1998 edition of the Nomina Anatomica, rebaptized as Terminologia Anatomica, the expression os ilium is reintroduced and os ilii deleted.

== Additional images ==
Pelvic girdle

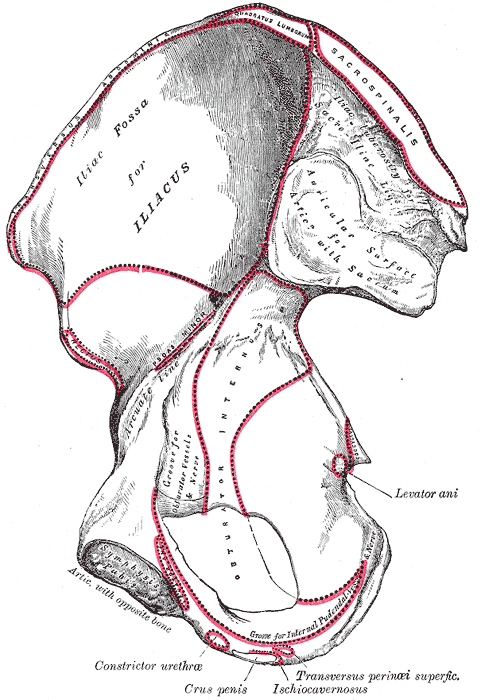
Right hip bone. Internal surface.

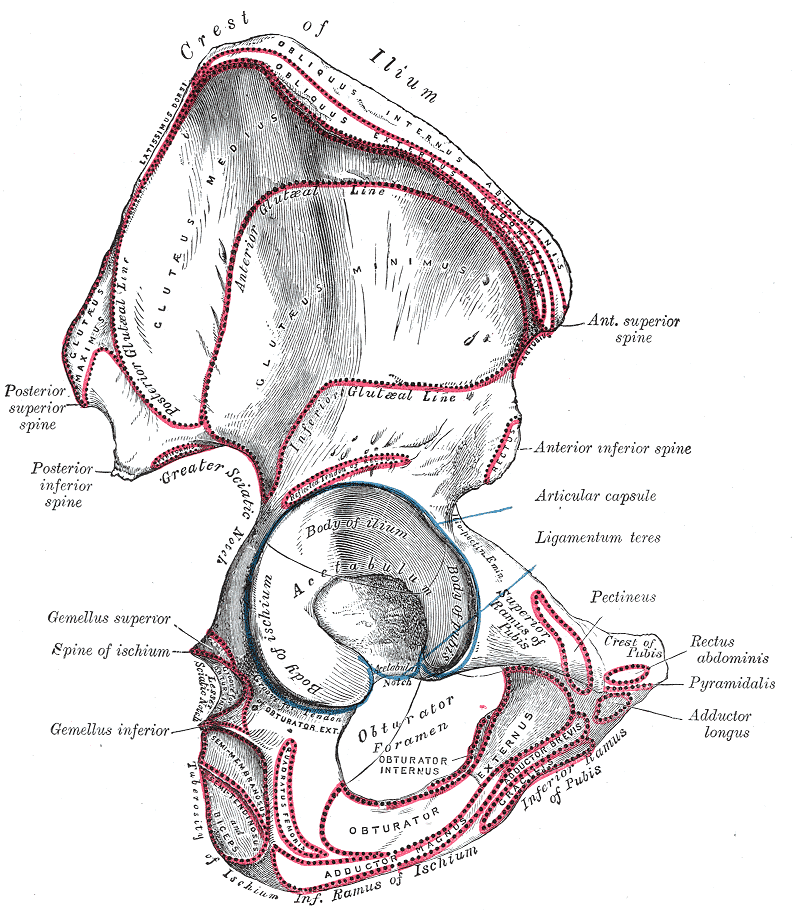
Right hip bone. External surface. (Body of ilium is the top of the blue circle in the center, and the wing of the ilium is the portion above that. Crest of ilium is labeled at top.)

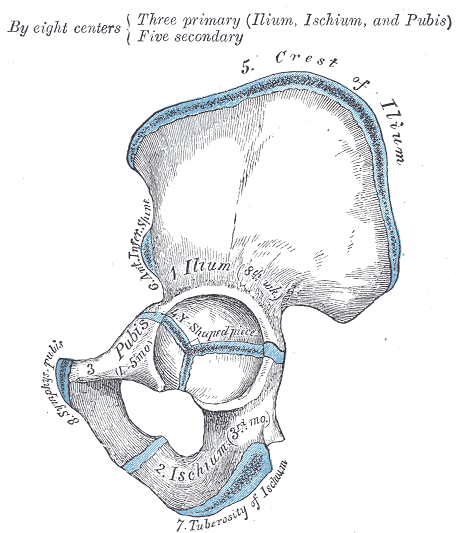
Plan of ossification of the hip bone.

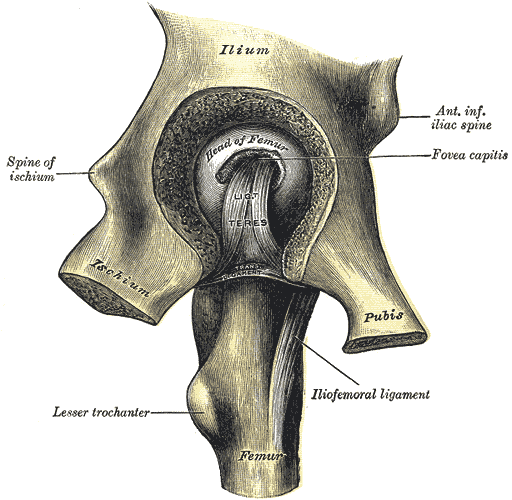
Left hip-joint, opened by removing the floor of the acetabulum from within the pelvis.

Pelvis

== See also ==
- Iliac crest
- Wing of ilium
