= Anterior superior iliac spine =

Bony projection of the iliac bone

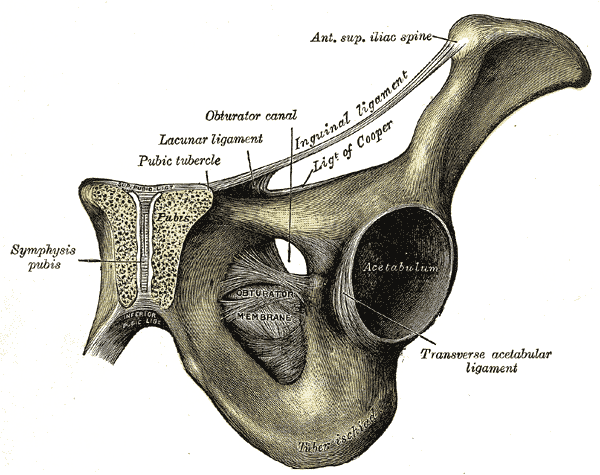
- The obturator membrane (anterior superior iliac spine visible in upper right of illustration)

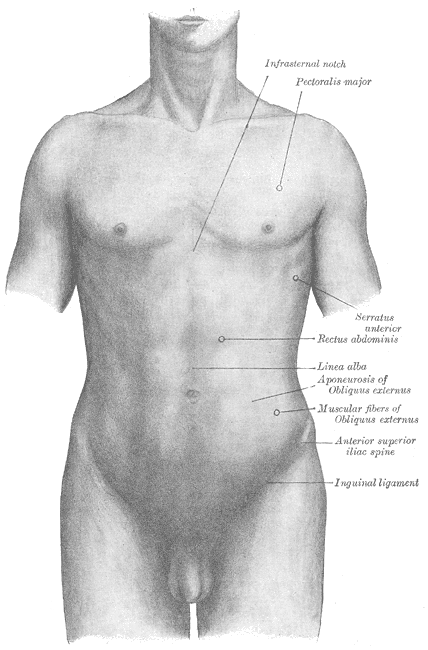
- Anterior superior iliac spine labeled second to bottom, right

Details

Identifiers
- Latin: spina iliaca anterior superior
- TA98: A02.5.01.111
- TA2: 1327
- FMA: 49465

The anterior superior iliac spine (ASIS) is a bony projection of the iliac bone, and an important landmark of surface anatomy. It refers to the anterior extremity of the iliac crest of the pelvis. It provides attachment for the inguinal ligament, and the sartorius muscle. The tensor fasciae latae muscle attaches to the lateral aspect of the superior anterior iliac spine, and also about 5 cm away at the iliac tubercle.

== Structure ==
The anterior superior iliac spine refers to the anterior extremity of the iliac crest of the pelvis. This is a key surface landmark, and easily palpated. It provides attachment for the inguinal ligament, the sartorius muscle, and the tensor fasciae latae muscle.

A variety of structures lie close to the anterior superior iliac spine, including the subcostal nerve, the femoral artery (which passes between it and the pubic symphysis), and the iliohypogastric nerve.

== Clinical significance ==
The anterior superior iliac spine provides a clue in identifying some other clinical landmarks, including McBurney's point, Roser-Nélaton line, and true leg length. It is an important surface landmark for various surgical approaches, such as treatment of hernia. The severity of symptoms of damage to the iliohypogastric nerve can show whether damage occurred above or below the anterior superior iliac spine.

Bone may be harvested from the nearby iliac crest for use elsewhere in the body. As the subcostal nerve lies close to the anterior superior iliac spine, this is put at risk of damage.

The iliotibial tract may be irritated where it passes over the anterior superior iliac spine in iliotibial band syndrome.

The line around anterior superior iliac spine is sometimes called the panty line or "bikini line". It is considered to be a "discreet" location for concealing cosmetic surgery scars and ports.

== Additional images ==
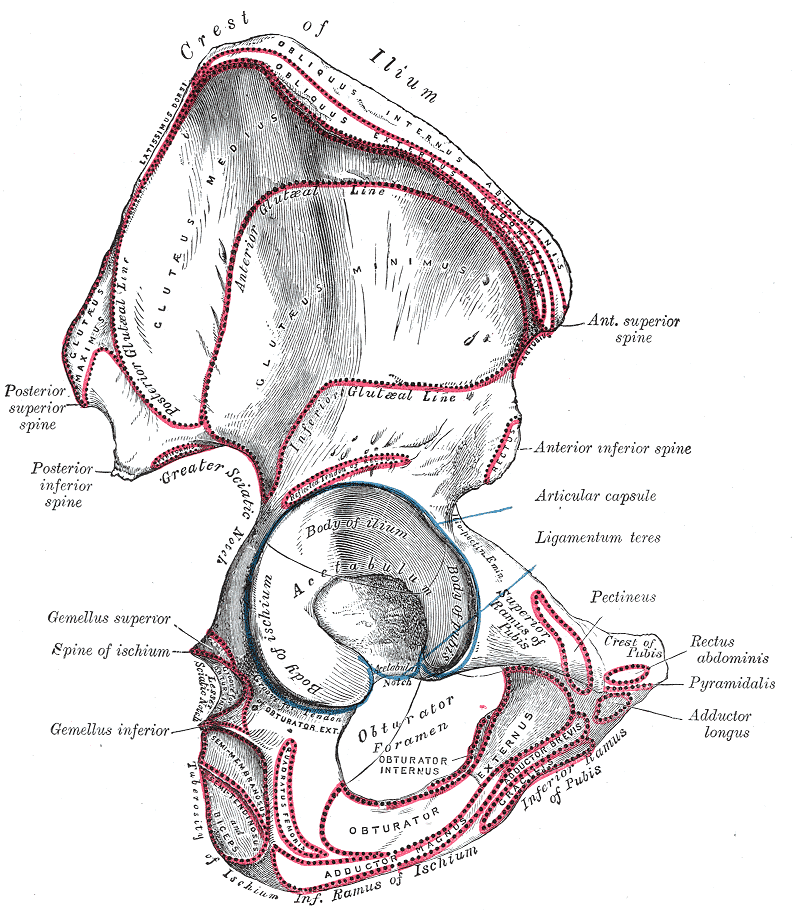
Right hip bone. External surface.

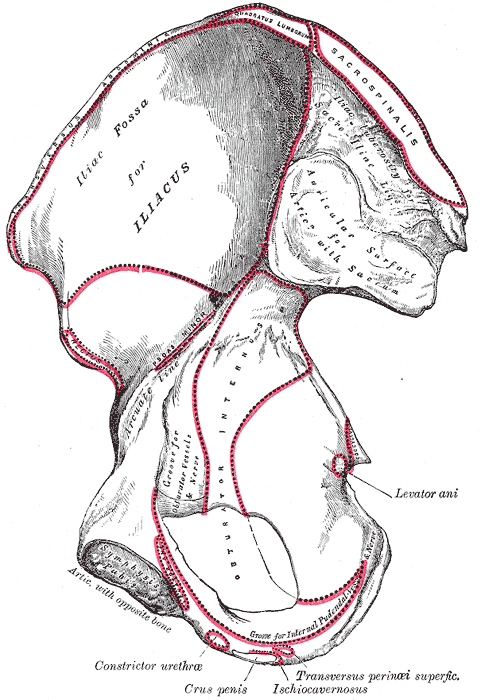
Right hip bone. Internal surface.

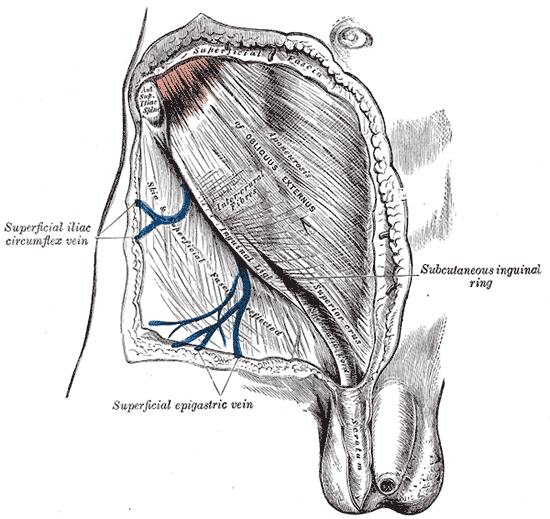
The subcutaneous inguinal ring

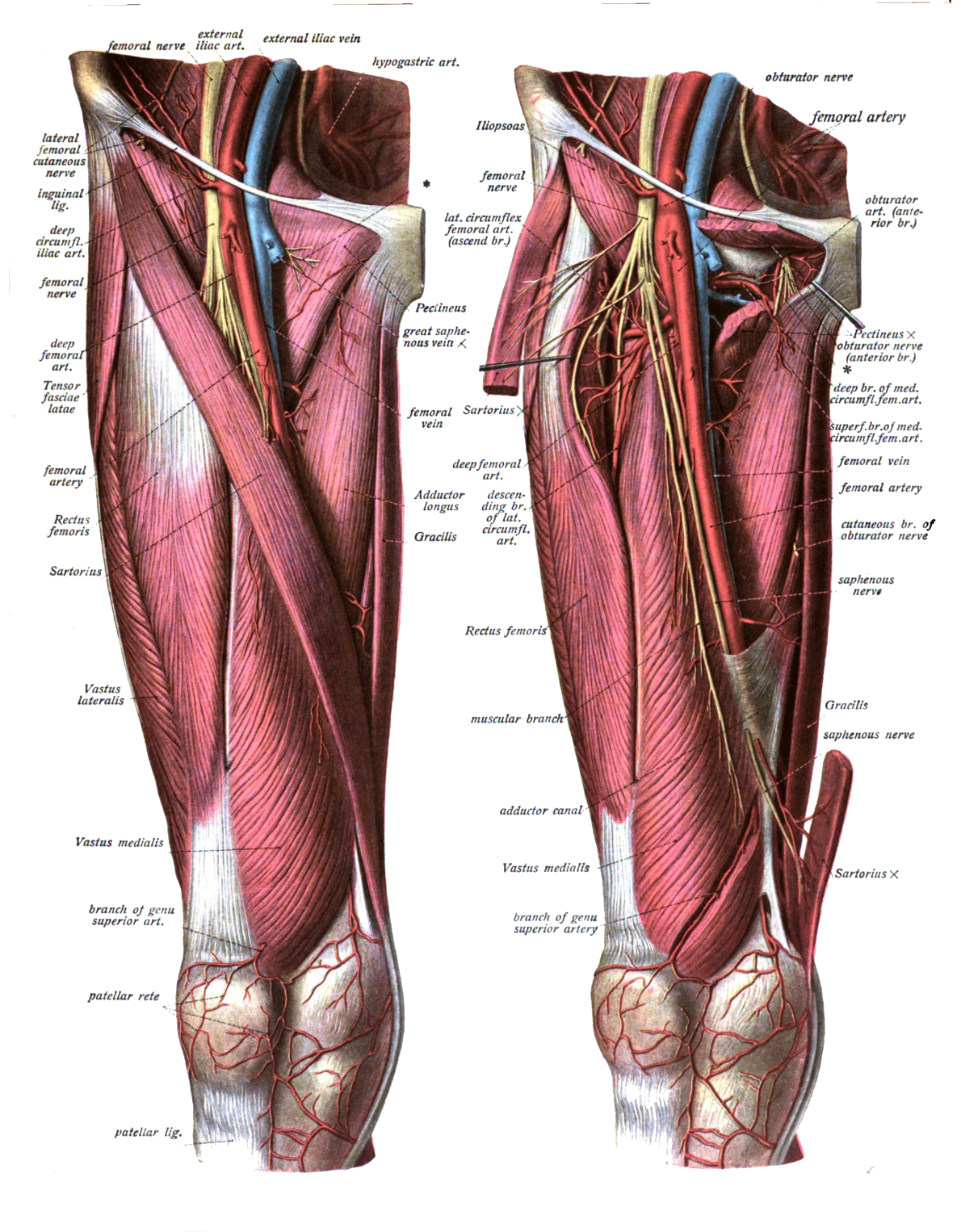
ASIS visible at top left, as the origin of several muscles

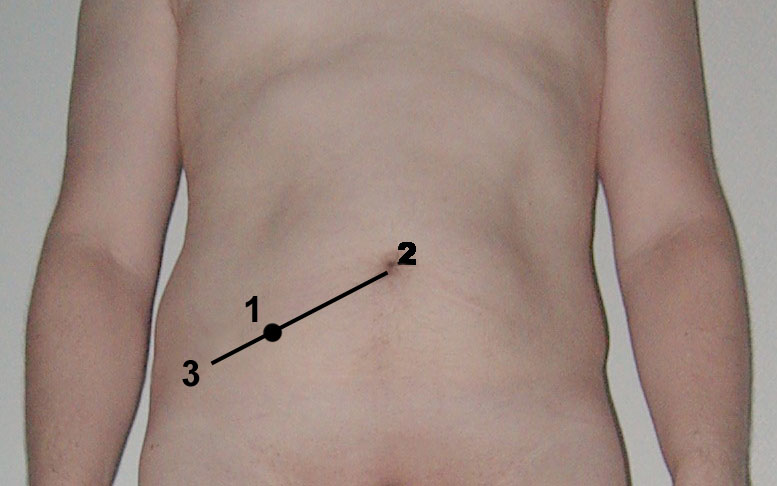
Location of McBurney's point (1), which is located two thirds the distance from the umbilicus (2) to the anterior superior iliac spine (3)

== See also ==
- Bone terminology
- Anatomical terms of location
- Ilium (bone)
- Human anatomical terms
