= Infrapatellar branch of saphenous nerve =

Nerve of the lower limb

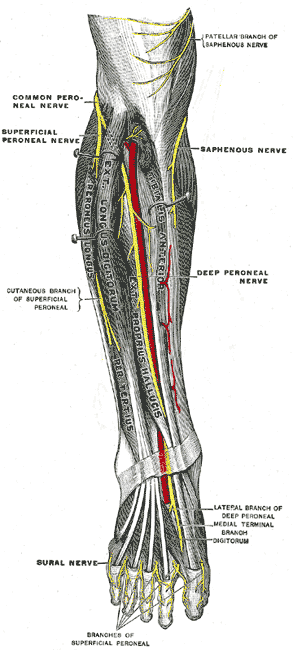
- Deep nerves of the front of the leg. (Patellar branch labeled at upper right.)

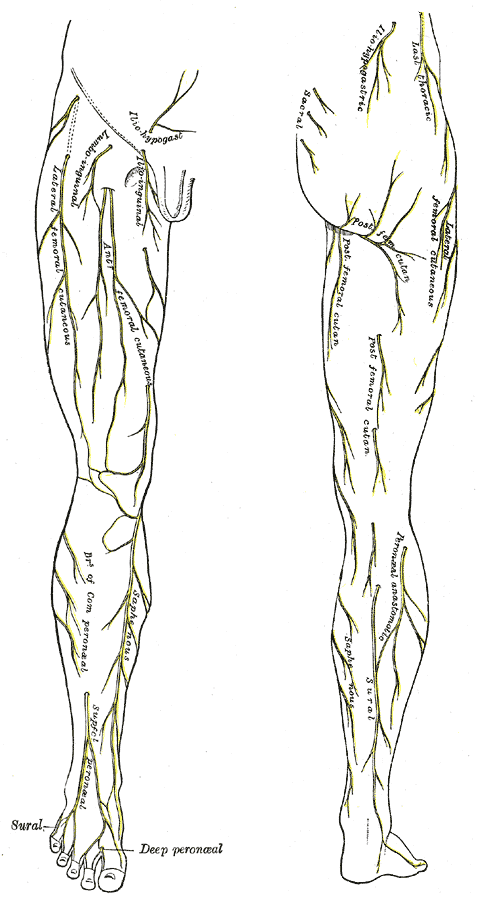
- Cutaneous nerves of the right lower extremity. Front and posterior views. (Infrapatellar visible but not labeled.)

Details
- From: saphenous nerve

Identifiers
- Latin: ramus infrapatellaris nervi sapheni
- TA98: A14.2.07.024
- TA2: 6526
- FMA: 45325

The infrapatellar branch of saphenous nerve is a nerve of the lower limb.

The saphenous nerve, located about the middle of the thigh, gives off a branch which joins the subsartorial plexus.

It pierces the sartorius and fascia lata, and is distributed to the skin in front of the patella.

This nerve communicates above the knee with the anterior cutaneous branches of the femoral nerve; below the knee, with other branches of the saphenous; and, on the lateral side of the joint, with branches of the lateral femoral cutaneous nerve, forming a plexiform net-work, the plexus patellae.

The infrapatellar branch is occasionally small, and ends by joining the anterior cutaneous branches of the femoral, which supply its place in front of the knee.
