= Cutaneous innervation of the lower limbs =

Area of the skin

Lower limb.

Foot.

Cutaneous innervation of the lower limbs is the nerve supply to areas of the skin of the lower limbs (including the feet) which are supplied by specific cutaneous nerves.

Modern texts are in agreement about which areas of the skin are served by which nerves, but there are minor variations in some of the details. The borders designated by the diagrams in the 1918 edition of Gray's Anatomy, provided below, are similar but not identical to those generally accepted today.

== Pelvis and buttocks ==
- Lumboinguinal nerve (green) and Ilioinguinal nerve (purple). In modern texts, these two regions are often considered to be innervated by the genitofemoral nerve.
- Medial cluneal nerves (pink) - labeled as "post. division of sacral"
- Inferior cluneal nerves (pink region, not designated with its own section)
- Perforating cutaneous nerve (pink region, not designated with its own section)
- Superior cluneal nerves (yellow) - labeled as "post. division of lumbar"
- Iliohypogastric nerve (blue)
- Subcostal nerve (purple) - labeled as "last thoracic"

== Thigh ==
- Lateral cutaneous nerve of thigh - labeled as "lateral femoral cutaneous" (pink)
- Anterior cutaneous branches of the femoral nerve (yellow)
- Cutaneous branch of the obturator nerve (yellow region, not designated with its own section)
- Posterior cutaneous nerve of thigh (green)

== Leg ==
- Common fibular nerve (blue) - labeled as "peroneal nerve". Also Lateral sural cutaneous nerve.
- Saphenous nerve (pink), a branch of the femoral nerve.
- Superficial fibular nerve (yellow) - labeled as "superficial peroneal nerve". Also Medial dorsal cutaneous nerve.
- Sural nerve (brown). Also Medial sural cutaneous nerve.

== Foot ==
(See foot diagram)

- Deep fibular nerve (green)
- Tibial nerve (blue). Also Medial calcaneal branches of the tibial nerve.
- Medial plantar nerve (yellow)
- Lateral plantar nerve (green)
