= Pes anserine bursitis =

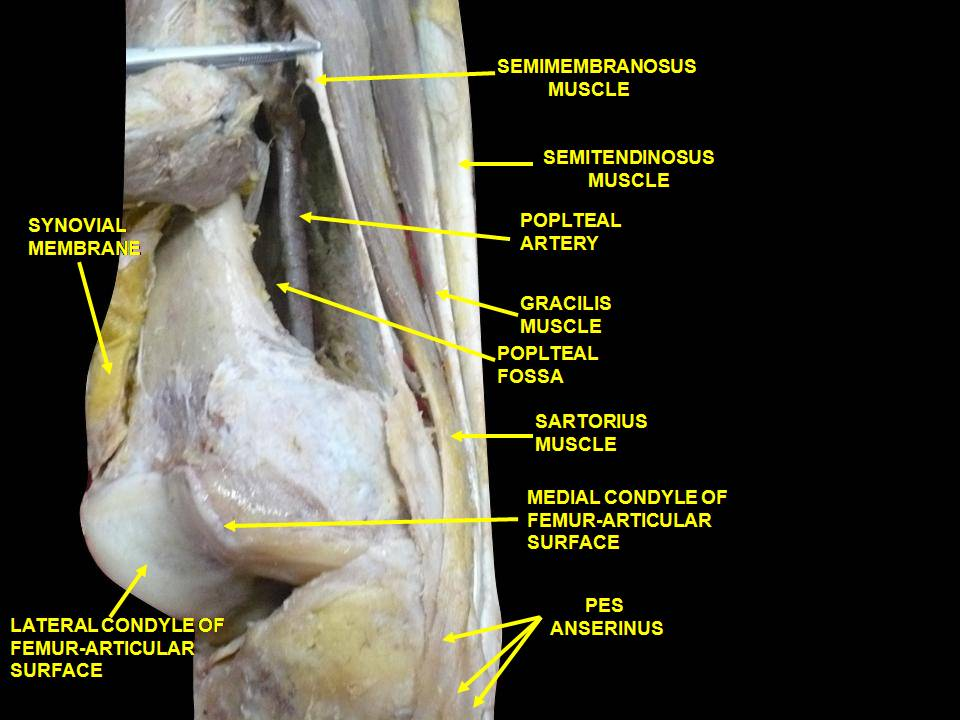
- Pes anserine is on the lower right side of image (pes anserine bursa lies beneath)
- Specialty: Orthopedic

Pes anserine bursitis is an inflammatory condition of the medial (inner) knee at the anserine bursa, a sub muscular bursa, just below the pes anserinus.

== Pathology ==
The pes anserinus is where the tendons of the sartorius, gracilis, and semitendinosus join at the medial knee, into the anteromedial proximal tibia.

Pes anserine bursitis may result from stress, overuse, obesity and trauma to this area. An occurrence of pes anserine bursitis commonly is characterized by pain at the medial knee and upper tibial region, especially when climbing stairs, tenderness, and local swelling.

=== Pathophysiology ===
The etymology of the name relates to the insertion of the conjoined tendons into the anteromedial proximal tibia. From anterior to posterior, the pes anserinus is made up of the tendons of the sartorius, gracilis, and semitendinosus muscles. The tendon's name, which literally means "goose's foot," was inspired by the pes anserinus's webbed, footlike structure. The conjoined tendon lies superficial to the tibial insertion of the medial collateral ligament (MCL) of the knee.

=== Muscles involved ===
- Sartorius aids in knee and hip flexion, as in sitting or climbing; abducts and laterally rotates thigh; innervated by the femoral nerve.
- Gracilis adducts the hip; flexes and medially rotates tibia at knee; innervated by the obturator nerve.
- Semitendinosus flexes knee; medially rotates tibia on femur when knee is flexed; medially rotates femur when hip is extended; counteracts forward bending at hips; innervated by tibial nerve and common fibular nerve.

== Diagnosis ==
Patients will typically present with pain at the medial knee when climbing stairs, rising from chairs or sitting with legs crossed. The site is sometimes swollen, but not always. The likelihood of pes anserine bursitis is increased in patients with osteoarthritis. Sometimes they report weakness or decreased range of motion. The physician examines the knee in full extension, looking for tenderness in the medial knee joint and across the proximal, medial tibial region, and feels for tenderness along the medial tendons of the pes anserine when the knee is flexed at 90 degrees.

Imaging is not commonly used for this diagnosis.

== Treatment ==
Pes anserine bursitis can be treated with a variety of physical therapy treatments, steroids, or surgery. Physical therapy include therapeutic ultrasound, electrical stimulation, rehabilitative exercises, and ice. The rehabilitative exercises are done with the intention of stretching and strengthening the hip abductors, quadriceps, and hamstrings. These stretches have the potential to significantly reduce the tension over the pes anserine bursa.
