= Medial cutaneous =

Medial cutaneous may refer to:

- Medial cutaneous nerve of arm
- Medial cutaneous nerve of forearm
- Anterior cutaneous branches of the femoral nerve of the upper leg
- Medial sural cutaneous nerve of the lower leg
- Medial crural cutaneous branches of saphenous nerve
- Medial dorsal cutaneous nerve of the foot
