= Branch of saphenous nerve =

Branch of saphenous nerve may refer to:

- Infrapatellar branch of saphenous nerve
- Medial crural cutaneous branches of saphenous nerve
