= Subsartorial plexus =

Plexus of nerves under the sartorius muscle

The subsartorial plexus is a plexus of nerves that is located under the sartorius muscle.

== Structure ==
The subsartorial plexus is formed by:

1. the medial cutaneous nerve of the thigh (a branch of the femoral nerve).
2. the saphenous nerve (a branch from femoral nerve).
3. the cutaneous branch of anterior division of the obturator nerve.

At the lower border of the adductor brevis muscle, the cutaneous branch of anterior division of the obturator nerve communicates with the anterior (medial), cutaneous and saphenous branches of the femoral nerve, forming a kind of plexus. It then descends upon the femoral artery, to which it is finally distributed.

=== Variation ===
Occasionally, the communicating branch to the anterior (medial), cutaneous and saphenous branches of the femoral is continued down, as a cutaneous branch, to the thigh and leg. When this is so, it emerges from beneath the lower border of the adductor longus muscle, descends along the posterior margin of the sartorius muscle to the medial side of the knee, where it pierces the deep fascia, communicates with the saphenous nerve, and is distributed to the skin of the tibial side of the leg as low down as its middle.

== Bibliography ==
- Henry Gray (1821–1865). Anatomy of the Human Body. 1918. IX. Neurology. 6d
