= Medial collateral ligament =

Ligament on the inner side of the knee joint

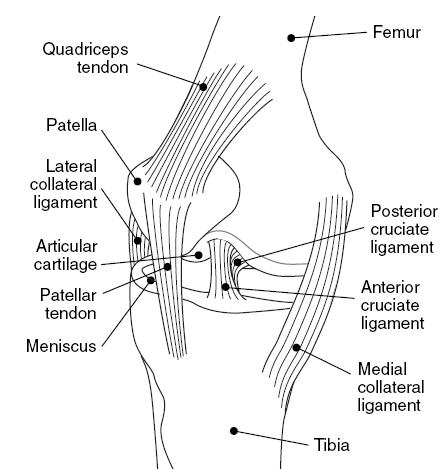
- Right knee anatomy. The medial collateral ligament is wide and flat, found on the medial side of the joint. Proximally, it attaches to the medial epicondyle of the femur, distally it attaches to the medial condyle of the tibia.

Details
- From: Medial epicondyle of the femur
- To: Medial condyle of tibia

Identifiers
- Latin: ligamentum collaterale tibiale
- MeSH: D017888
- TA98: A03.6.08.012
- TA2: 1896
- FMA: 44600

The medial collateral ligament (MCL), also called the superficial medial collateral ligament (sMCL) or tibial collateral ligament (TCL), is one of the major ligaments of the knee. It is on the medial (inner) side of the knee joint and occurs in humans and other primates. Its primary function is to resist valgus (inward bending) forces on the knee.

== Structure ==
The MCL is a broad, flat, membranous band, situated slightly posterior on the medial side of the knee joint. It is attached proximally to the medial epicondyle of the femur, immediately below the adductor tubercle; below to the medial condyle of the tibia and medial surface of its body.

It resists forces that would push the knee medially, which would otherwise produce valgus deformity. It provides up to 78% of the restraining force that resists valgus (inward pressing) loads on the knee.

The fibers of the posterior part of the ligament are short and incline backward as they descend; they are inserted into the tibia above the groove for the semimembranosus muscle.

The anterior part of the ligament is a flattened band, about 10 centimeters long, which inclines forward as it descends.

It is inserted into the medial surface of the body of the tibia about 2.5 centimeters below the level of the condyle.

Crossing on top of the lower part of the MCL is the pes anserinus, the joined tendons of the sartorius, gracilis, and semitendinosus muscles; a bursa is interposed between the two.

The MCL's deep surface covers the inferior medial genicular vessels and nerve and the anterior portion of the tendon of the semimembranosus muscle, with which it is connected by a few fibers; it is intimately adherent to the medial meniscus.

=== Development ===
Embryologically and phylogenically, the ligament represents the distal portion of the tendon of adductor magnus muscle. In lower animals, adductor magnus inserts into the tibia. Because of this, the ligament occasionally contains muscle fibres. This is an atavistic variation.

== Clinical significance ==
=== Injury ===
An MCL injury can be very painful and is caused by a valgus stress to a slightly bent knee, often when landing, bending or on high impact. It may be difficult to apply pressure on the injured leg for at least a few days. It can be caused by a direct blow to the lateral side of the knee.

The most common knee structure damaged in skiing is the medial collateral ligament, although the carve turn has diminished the incidence somewhat. MCL strains and tears are also fairly common in American football. The center and the guards are the most common victims of this type of injury due to the grip trend on their cleats, although sometimes it can be caused by a helmet striking the knee. The number of football players who get this injury has increased in recent years. Companies are currently trying to develop better cleats that will prevent the injury. MCL is also crucially affected in breaststroke and many professional swimmers suffer from chronic MCL pains.

There are three distinct levels in a MCL injury. Grade 1 is a minor sprain, grade 2 is a major sprain or a minor tear, and grade 3 is a major tear. Based on the grade of the injury treatment options will vary.

==== Treatment ====
Depending on the grade of the injury, the lowest grade (grade 1) can take between 2 and 10 weeks for the injury to fully heal. Recovery times for grades 2 and 3 can take several weeks to several months.

Treatment of a partial tear or stretch injury is usually conservative. Most injuries that are partial and isolated can be treated without surgery. This includes measures to control inflammation as well as bracing. Kannus has shown good clinical results with conservative care of grade II sprains, but poor results in grade III sprains. As a result, more severe grade III and IV injuries to the MCL that lead to ongoing instability may require arthroscopic surgery. However, the medical literature considers surgery for most MCL injuries to be controversial. Isolated MCL sprains are common.

== Additional images ==
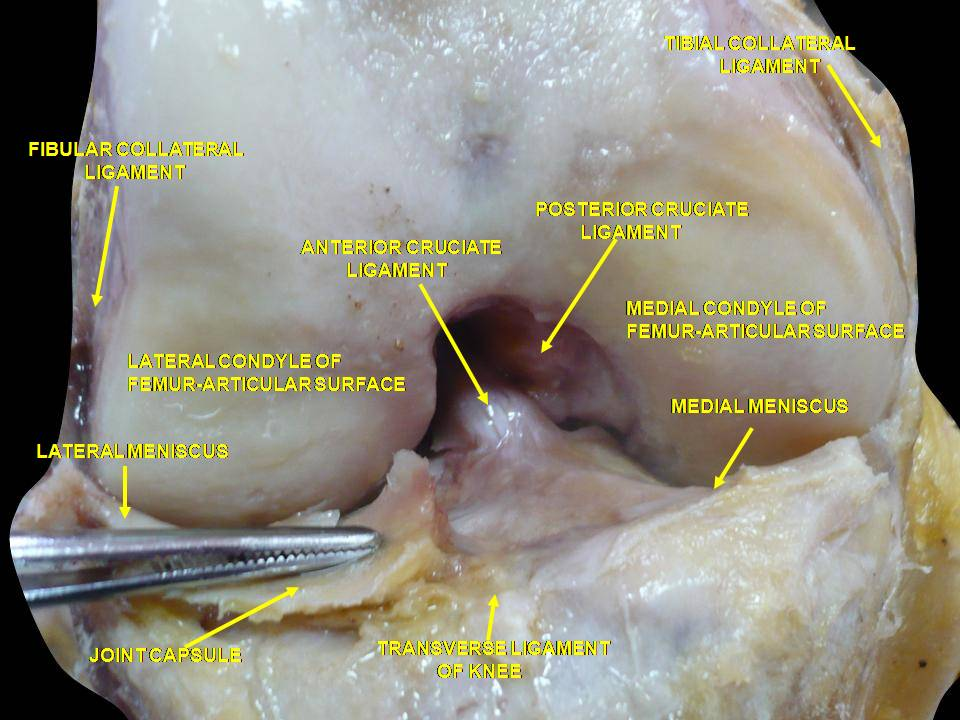
Anterior view of knee
