= Anserine bursa =

Bursa on the lower limb

Details

Identifiers
- Latin: Bursa anserina
- TA98: A04.8.05.022
- TA2: 2743
- FMA: 45201

Location of the anserine bursa

The anserine bursa (tibial intertendinous bursa) is a sub muscular bursa located deep to the pes anserinus on the anteromedial proximal tibia. Pes anserine bursitis is a common inflammatory condition of the anserine bursa.
