= Anterior cutaneous branch =

Anterior cutaneous branch may refer to:

- Anterior cutaneous branches of the femoral nerve
- Anterior cutaneous branch of the iliohypogastric nerve
