= Patellar plexus =

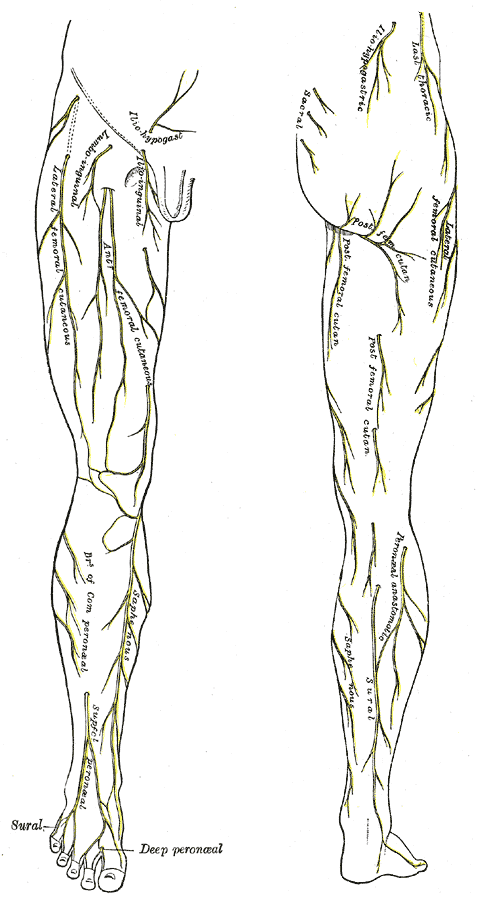
- Cutaneous nerves of the right lower extremity. Front and posterior views. (Patellar plexus visible but not labeled.)

Details

Identifiers
- Latin: plexus patellaris

The patellar plexus is a nerve plexus within the subcutaneous tissue overlying and surrounding the patella and ligamentum patellae. It is a fine network of communicating nerve fibres.

It is formed by the anterior division of lateral femoral cutaneous nerve, terminal branches of the intermediate femoral cutaneous nerve, terminal branches of the medial femoral cutaneous nerve, and the infrapatellar branch of saphenous nerve.
