= Anterior cutaneous branches of the femoral nerve =

Aspect of human anatomy

- Cutaneous nerves of the right leg. Front and posterior views (anterior cutaneous branches of the femoral nerve in yellow, near center, on both sides.)

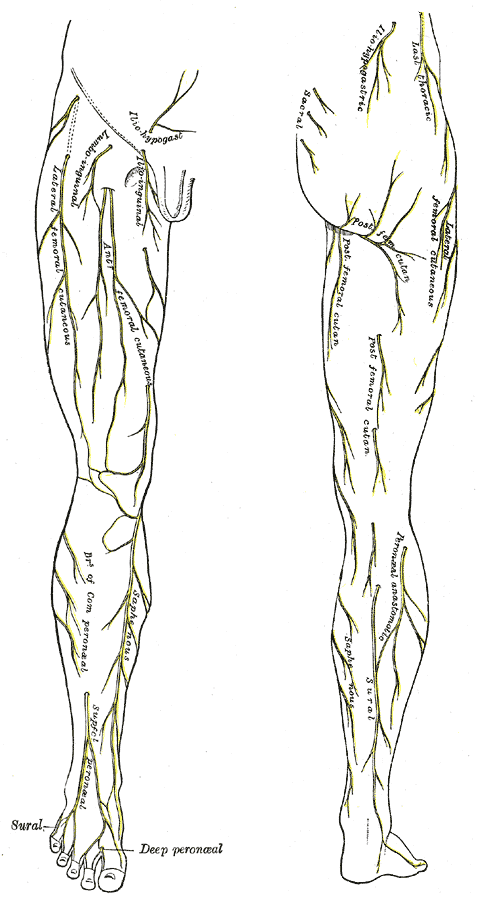
- Cutaneous nerves of the right leg. Front and posterior views.

Details
- From: Femoral nerve

Identifiers
- Latin: rami cutanei anteriores nervi femoralis
- TA98: A14.2.07.022
- TA2: 6524
- FMA: 45250

The anterior cutaneous branches of the femoral nerve consist of the following nerves: intermediate cutaneous nerve and medial cutaneous nerve.

== Intermediate cutaneous nerve of thigh ==
The intermediate cutaneous nerve (middle cutaneous nerve) pierces the fascia lata (and generally the sartorius) about 7.5 cm below the inguinal ligament, and divides into two branches which descend in immediate proximity along the forepart of the thigh, to supply the skin as low as the front of the knee.

Here they communicate with the anterior division of lateral cutaneous nerve, the anterior division of medial cutaneous nerve and the infrapatellar branch of the saphenous, to form the patellar plexus.

In the upper part of the thigh the lateral branch of the intermediate cutaneous communicates with the lumboinguinal branch of the genitofemoral nerve.

== Medial cutaneous nerve of thigh ==
The medial cutaneous nerve (internal cutaneous nerve) passes obliquely across the upper part of the sheath of the femoral artery, and divides in front, or at the medial side of that vessel, into two branches, an anterior and a posterior.

The anterior branch runs downward on the sartorius, perforates the fascia lata at the lower third of the thigh, and divides into two branches: one supplies the integument as low down as the medial side of the knee; the other crosses to the lateral side of the patella, communicating in its course with the infrapatellar branch of the saphenous nerve.

The posterior branch descends along the medial border of the sartorius to the knee, where it pierces the fascia lata, communicates with the saphenous nerve, and gives off several cutaneous branches.

It then passes down to supply the integument of the medial side of the leg.

Beneath the fascia lata, at the lower border of the adductor longus, it joins to form a plexiform net-work (subsartorial plexus) with branches of the saphenous and obturator nerves.

When the communicating branch from the obturator nerve is large and continued to the integument of the leg, the posterior branch of the medial cutaneous is small, and terminates in the plexus, occasionally giving off a few cutaneous filaments.

The medial cutaneous nerve, before dividing, gives off a few filaments, which pierce the fascia lata, to supply the integument of the medial side of the thigh, accompanying the long saphenous vein.

One of these filaments passes through the saphenous opening; a second becomes subcutaneous about the middle of the thigh; a third pierces the fascia at its lower third.

== Additional images ==
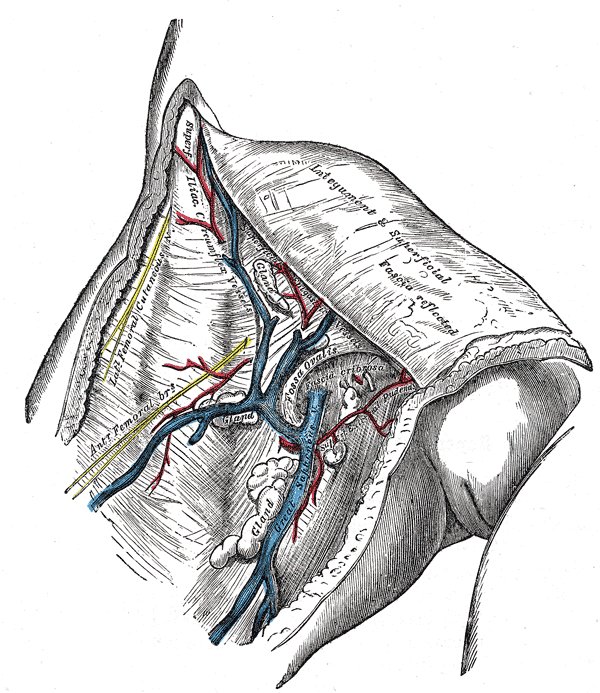
The great saphenous vein and its tributaries at the fossa ovalis.

Cross section of thigh
