= Semitendinosus muscle =

One of the hamstring muscles

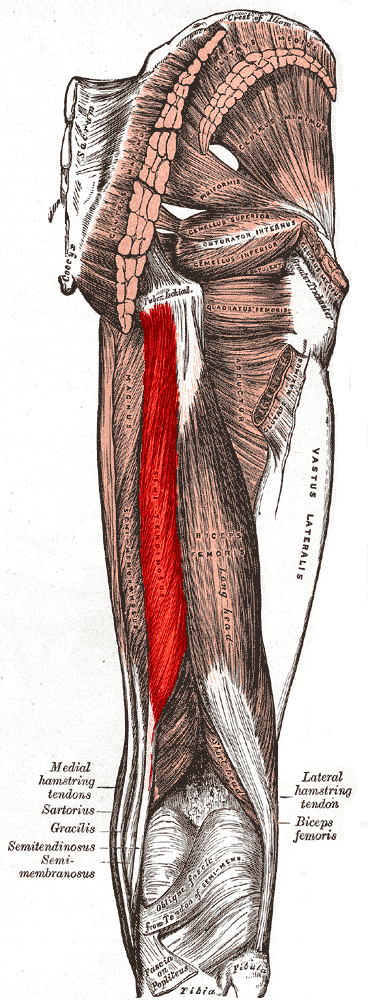
- Muscles of the gluteal and posterior femoral regions. Semitendinosus labeled at bottom left.

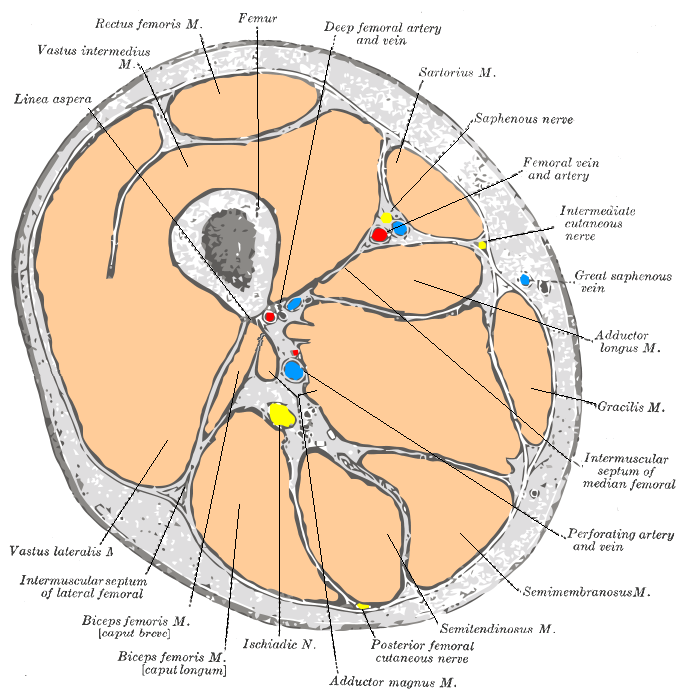
- Horizontal section of left thigh, viewed from above. Semitendinosus visible at bottom right.

Details
- Origin: Lower quadrangular part of tuberosity of the ischium
- Insertion: Pes anserinus (tibia)
- Artery: Inferior gluteal artery, perforating arteries
- Nerve: Sciatic (tibial, L5, S1, S2)
- Actions: Flexion of knee, extension of the hip joint
- Antagonist: Quadriceps muscle

Identifiers
- Latin: musculus semitendinosus
- TA98: A04.7.02.035
- TA2: 2641
- FMA: 22357

The semitendinosus (/ˌsɛmiˌtɛndɪˈnoʊsəs/) is a long superficial muscle in the back of the thigh. It is so named because it has a very long tendon of insertion. It lies posteromedially in the thigh, superficial to the semimembranosus.

== Structure ==
The semitendinosus, remarkable for the great length of its tendon of insertion, is situated at the posterior and medial aspect of the thigh.

It arises from the lower and medial impression on the upper part of the tuberosity of the ischium, by a tendon common to it and the long head of the biceps femoris; it also arises from an aponeurosis which connects the adjacent surfaces of the two muscles to the extent of about 7.5 cm. from their origin.

The muscle is fusiform and ends a little below the middle of the thigh in a long round tendon which lies along the medial side of the popliteal fossa; it then curves around the medial condyle of the tibia and passes over the medial collateral ligament of the knee-joint, from which it is separated by a bursa, and is inserted into the upper part of the medial surface of the body of the tibia, nearly as far forward as its anterior crest.

The semitendinosus is more superficial than the semimembranosus (with which it shares very close insertion and attachment points). However, as the semimembranosus is wider and flatter than the semitendinosus, it is possible to palpate the semimembranosus directly.

At its insertion it gives off from its lower border a prolongation to the deep fascia of the leg and lies behind the tendon of the sartorius, and below that of the gracilis, to which it is united. These three tendons form what is known as the pes anserinus, so named because it looks like the foot of a goose.

=== Innervation ===
A lower motor neuron exits to the sacral plexus exiting through the spinal levels L5-S2. From the sacral plexus, the lower motor neuron travels down the sciatic nerve. The sciatic nerve branches into the deep fibular nerve and the tibial nerve. The tibial nerve innervates the semitendinosus as well as the other hamstring muscles, the semimembranosus and biceps femoris.

== Function ==
The semitendinosus muscle is one of three hamstring muscles that are located at the back of the thigh. The other two are the semimembranosus muscle and the biceps femoris. The semitendinosus muscle lies between the other two. These three muscles work collectively to flex the knee and extend the hip.

The muscle also helps to medially rotate the tibia on the femur when the knee is flexed and medially rotate the femur when the hip is extended. It counteracts forward bending at the hips as well.

== Clinical significance ==
Along with patellar ligament and quadriceps femoris, semitendinosus/gracilis (STG) tendon autografts has been used commonly and successfully for anterior cruciate ligament reconstruction. Sufficient graft size could typically be obtained using either a semitendinosus/gracilis tendon double-bundle technique, or a quadruple-bundle technique using a single tendon.

There is some controversy as to how well a hamstring tendon regenerates after the harvesting. Most studies suggest that the tendon can be regenerated at least partially, though it will still be weaker than the original tendon.

== Additional images ==
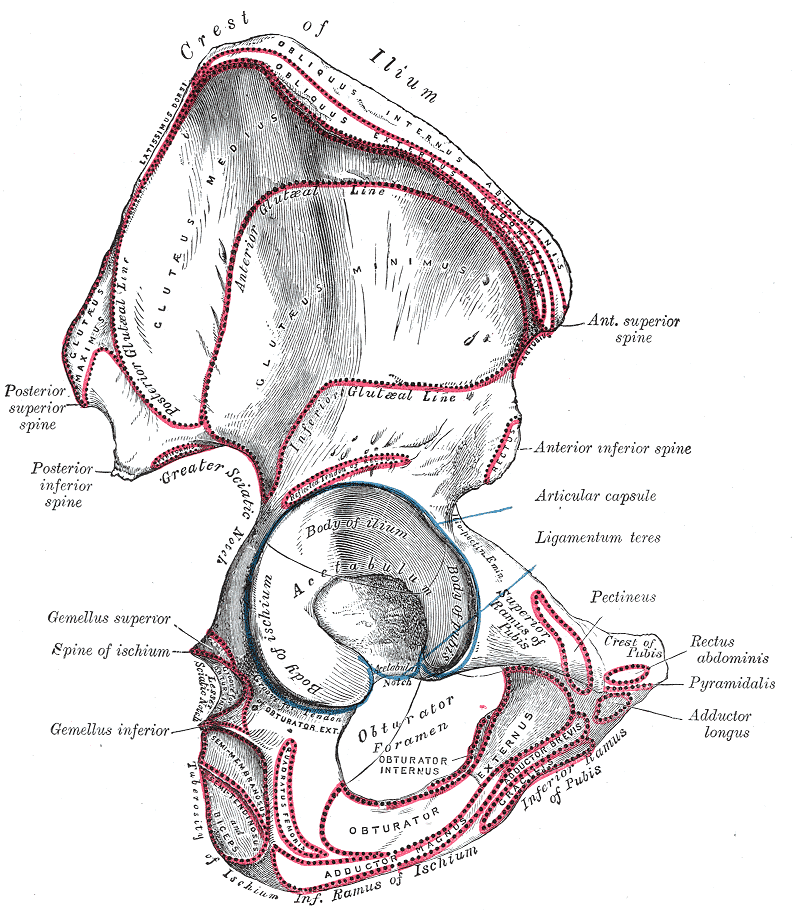
Right hip bone. External surface.

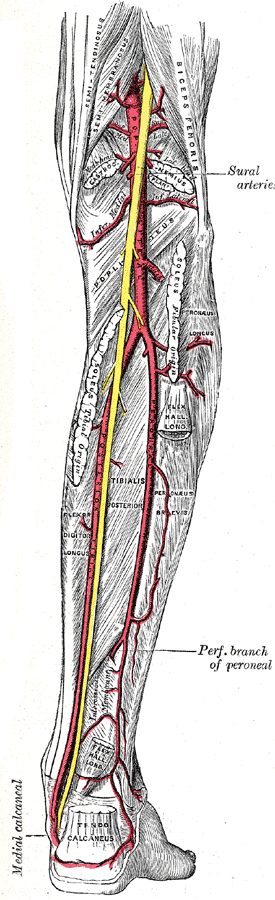
The popliteal, posterior tibial, and peroneal arteries.

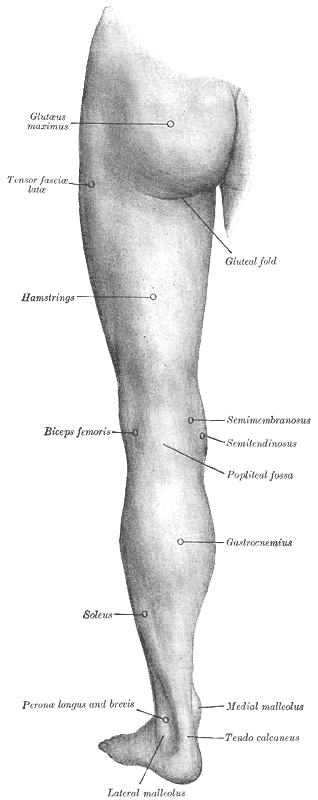
Back of left lower extremity.

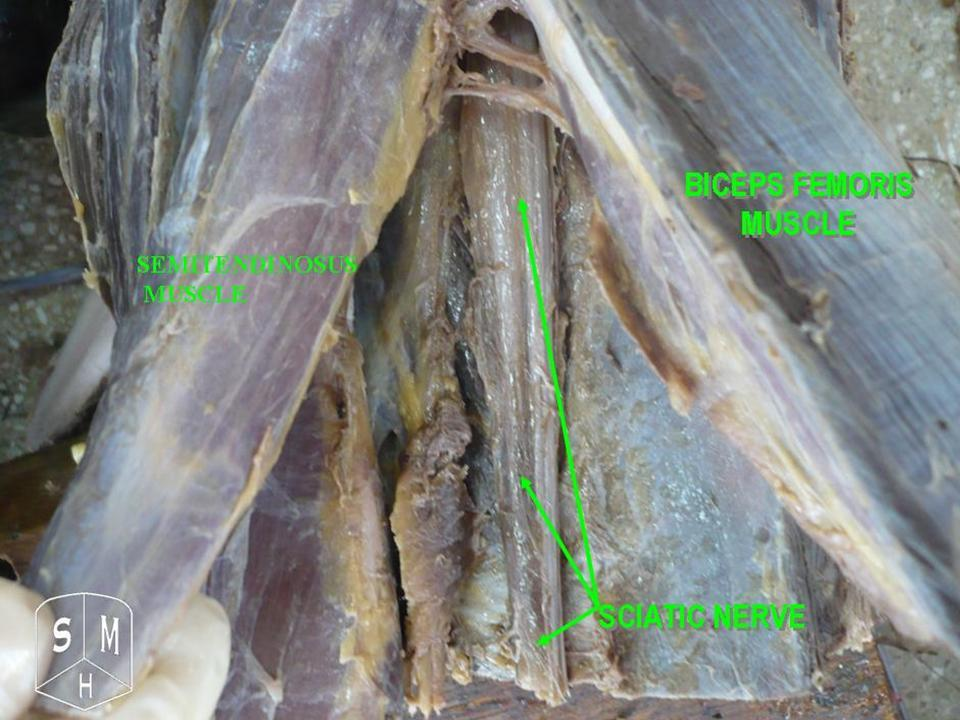
Semitendinosus muscle

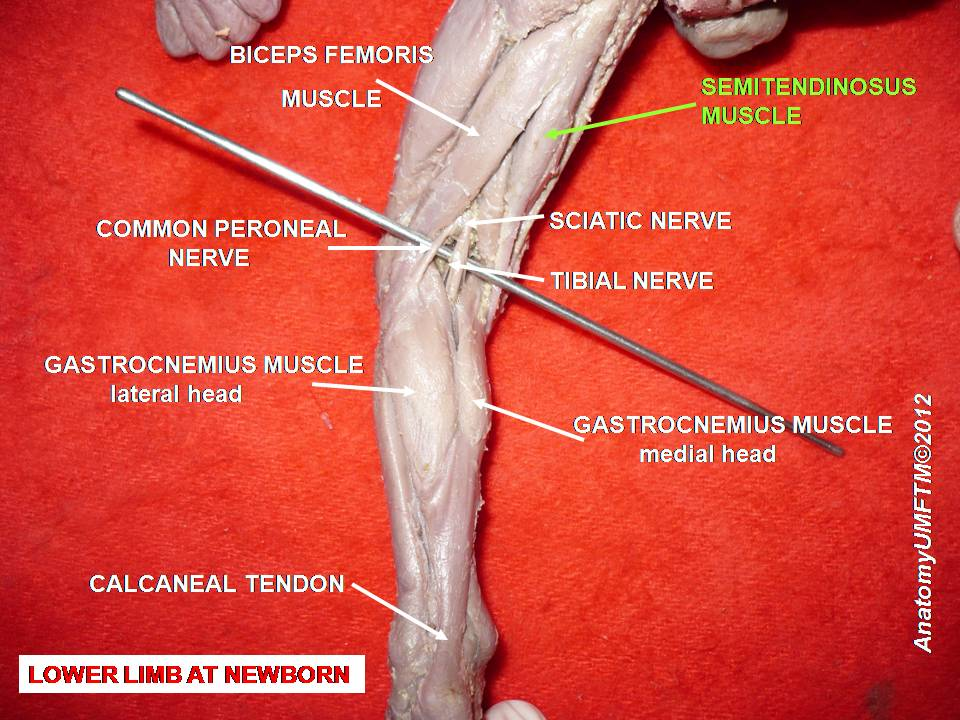
Semitendinosus muscle

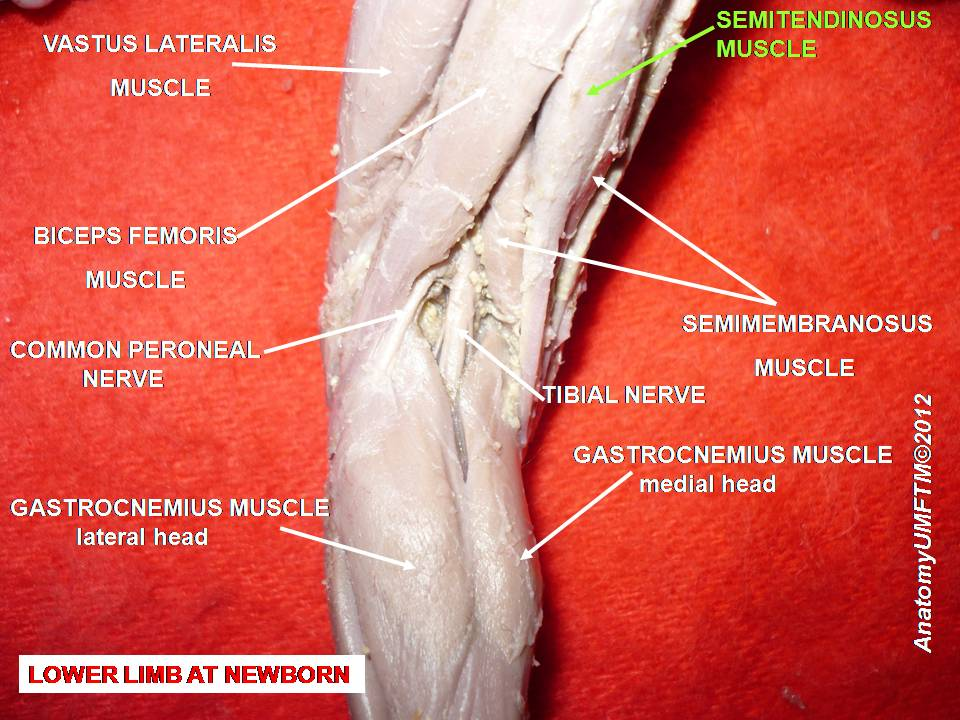
Semitendinosus muscle

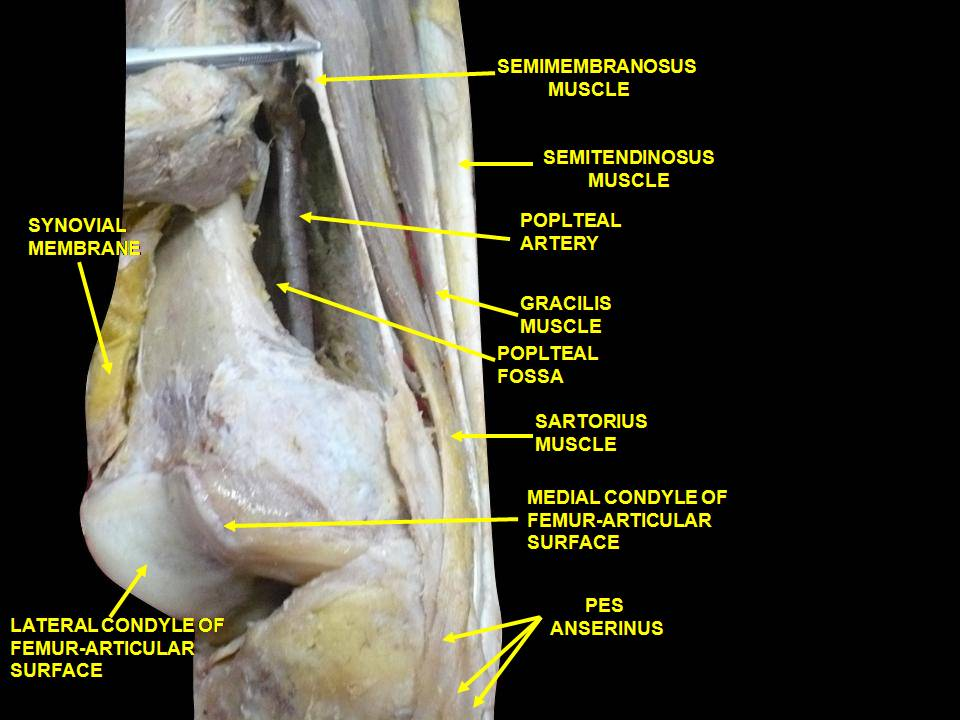
Muscles of thigh. Lateral view.

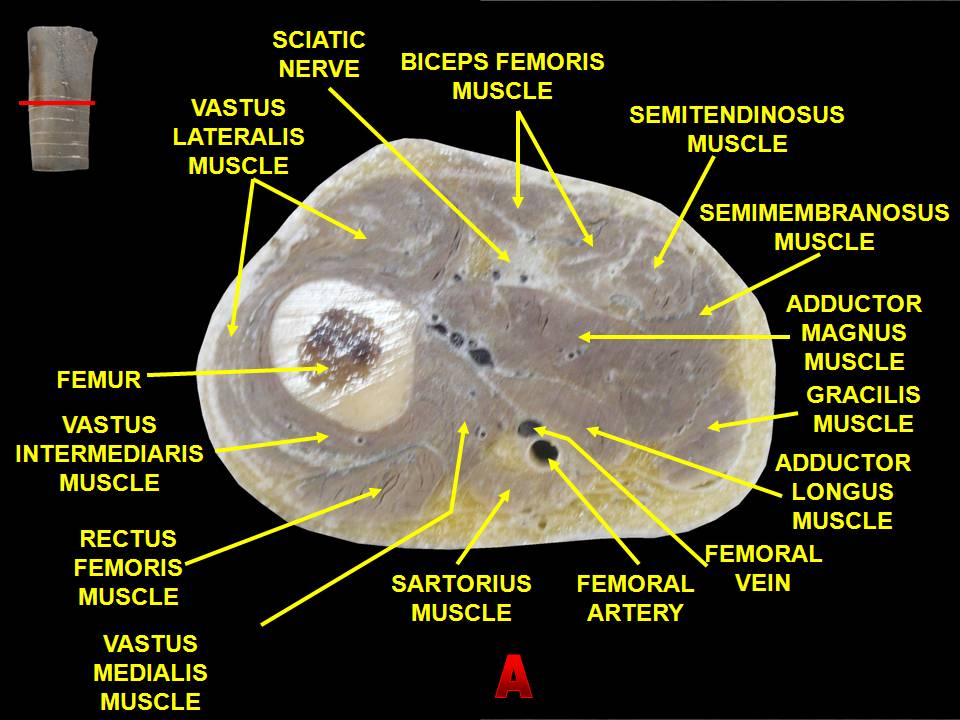
Muscles of thigh. Cross section.

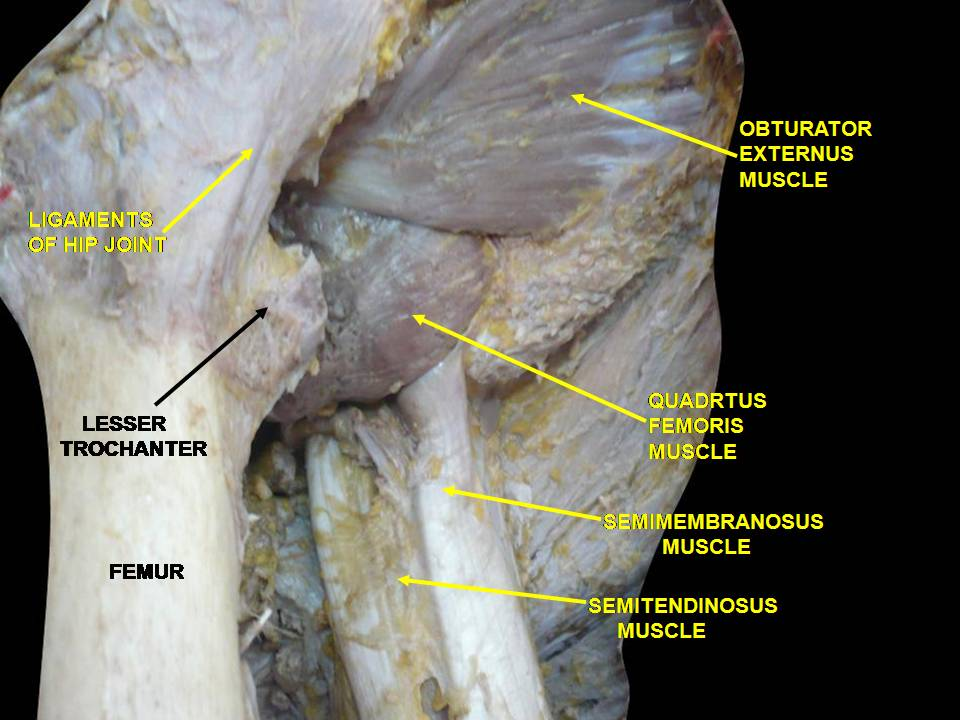
Muscles of thigh. Anterior views.

== See also ==
- Semimembranosus
- Biceps femoris
