= Pes anserinus (leg) =

Tendons of the leg

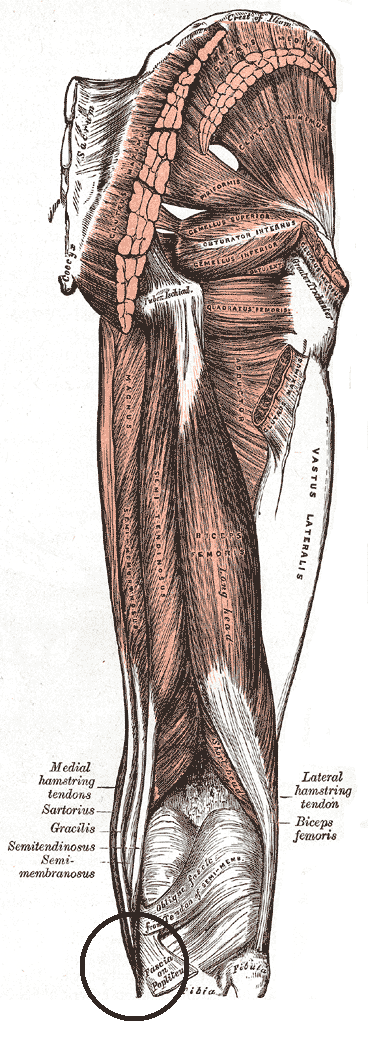
- Muscles of the gluteal and posterior femoral regions. Area of pes anserinus is encircled at bottom. Sartorius, gracilis, semitendinosus and semimembranosus are labeled at bottom left.

Details

Identifiers
- Latin: pes anserinus
- TA2: 2612
- FMA: 311256

Pes anserinus ("goose foot") refers to the conjoined tendons of three muscles of the thigh. Pes means 'foot' in Latin. In Latin, anser means 'goose', and anserinus means 'goose-like'.

Pes anserinus inserts onto the anteromedial (front and inside) surface of the proximal tibia. The muscles are the sartorius, gracilis and semitendinosus. The name "goose foot" arises from the three-pronged manner in which the conjoined tendon inserts onto the tibia.

== Structure ==
The three tendons, from front to back, that conjoin to form the pes anserinus come from the sartorius muscle, the gracilis muscle, and the semitendinosus muscle. It inserts onto the proximal anteromedial surface of the tibia.

The pes anserinus is around 5 cm below the medial tibial joint line. It lies superficial to the tibial insertion of the medial collateral ligament of the knee.

== Clinical significance ==
Pes anserinus tendinitis/bursitis syndrome, or pes anserine bursitis, is a cause of chronic knee pain and weakness. It occurs when the medial portion of the knee is inflamed. If the bursa underlying the tendons of the sartorius, gracilis, and semitendinosus gets irritated from overuse or injury, a person can develop this ailment. This condition usually occurs in athletes from overuse. This pathology is characterized by pain, swelling, and / or tenderness.

The semitendinosus tendon can be used in certain techniques for reconstruction of the anterior cruciate ligament.

== History ==
The name "goose foot" arises from the three-pronged manner in which the conjoined tendon inserts onto the tibia.

== Additional images ==
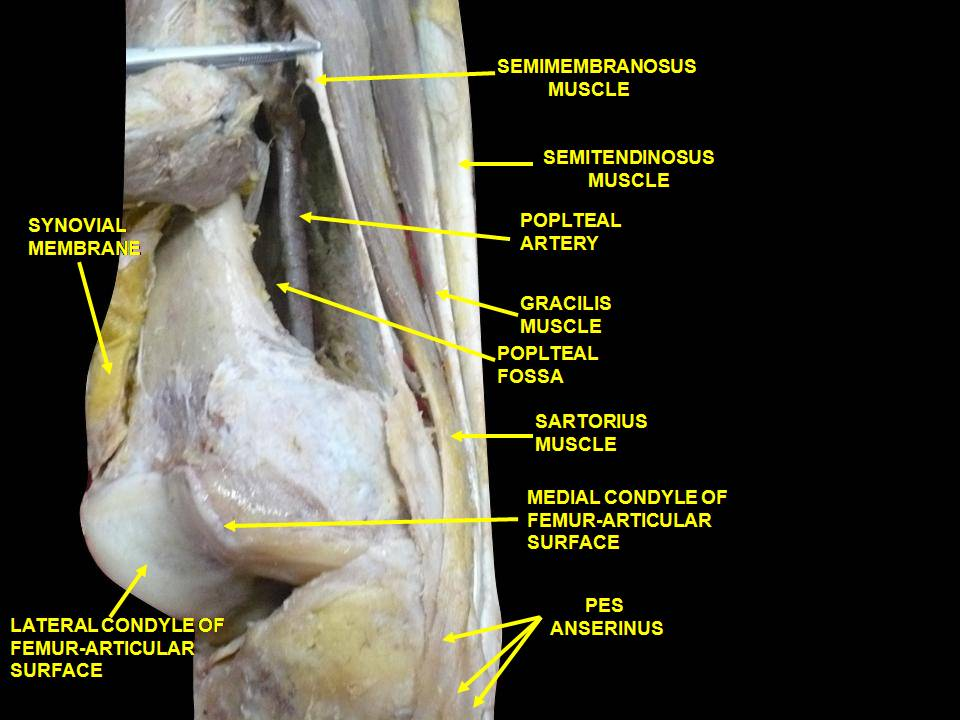
Muscles of the posteromedial thigh, medial view.
