= Gracilis muscle =

Most superficial muscle on the medial side of the thigh

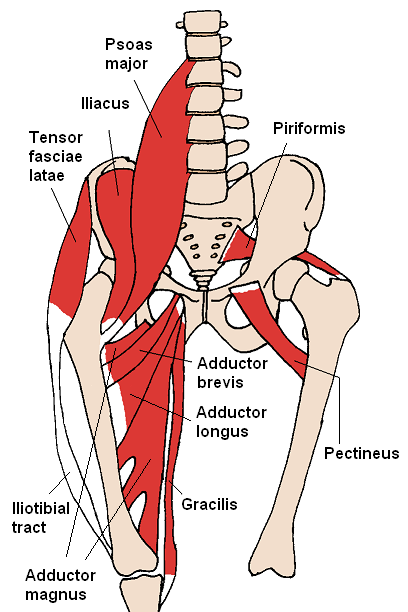
- The gracilis and nearby muscles

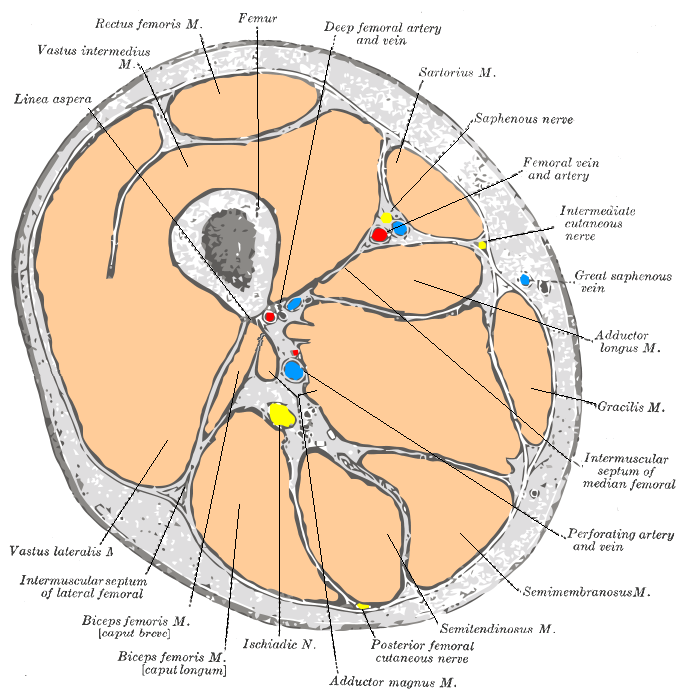
- Cross-sectional diagram of the right mid-thigh. The gracilis is labeled on the far right.

Details
- Origin: Ischiopubic ramus
- Insertion: Tibia (pes anserinus)
- Artery: Medial circumflex femoral artery
- Nerve: Anterior branch of obturator nerve
- Actions: Flexes, medially rotates, and adducts the hip

Identifiers
- Latin: musculus gracilis
- MeSH: D000071976
- TA98: A04.7.02.030
- TA2: 2635
- FMA: 43882

The gracilis muscle (/ˈɡræsɪlɪs/; Latin for "slender") is the most superficial muscle on the medial side of the thigh. It is thin, flattened and broad above (proximal); narrow and tapered below (distal).

== Structure ==
It arises by a thin aponeurosis from the anterior margins of the lower half of the symphysis pubis and the upper half of the pubic arch.

The muscle's fibers run vertically downward, ending in a rounded tendon. This tendon passes behind the medial condyle of the femur, curves around the medial condyle of the tibia where it becomes flattened, and inserts into the upper part of the medial surface of the body of the tibia, below the condyle. For this reason, the muscle is a lower limb adductor. At its insertion the tendon is situated immediately above that of the semitendinosus muscle, and its upper edge is overlapped by the tendon of the sartorius muscle, which it joins to form the pes anserinus. The pes anserinus is separated from the medial collateral ligament of the knee-joint by a bursa.

A few of the fibers of the lower part of the tendon are prolonged into the deep fascia of the leg.

=== Relations ===
By its inner or superficial surface gracilis is in relation with the fascia lata, and below with the sartorius and internal saphenous nerve; the internal saphenous vein crosses it lying superficially to the fascia lata.

By its outer or deep surface with the adductor longus, brevis, and magnus, and the internal lateral ligament of the knee-joint, from which it is separated by a synovial bursa common to the tendons of the gracilis and semitendinosus.

=== Nerve supply ===
The obturator nerve innervates the gracilis muscle via the lumbar spinal vertebrae.

== Function ==
The muscle adducts, medially rotates (with hip flexion), laterally rotates, and flexes the hip as above, and also aids in flexion of the knee.

== Clinical significance ==
The gracilis muscle is commonly used as a flap in microsurgery. According to the classification of Mathes and Nahai, it presents a type II blood supply, allowing it to be transferred on its artery derived from the medial circumflex femoral artery. This artery enters the muscle about 10 cm from the pubic symphysis. At this point (or 1 cm proximal) the nerve also enters.

Gracilis muscle is widely used in reconstructive surgery (graciloplasty), either as a pedicled flap or as a free microsurgical flap. Both pedicled and free flaps can be muscular or musculocutaneous (the so- called "composite flaps"). As a pedicled flap, gracilis muscle can be used in perineal and vaginal reconstruction, after oncological surgery, in the treatment of recurrent anovaginal and rectovaginal fistulas as well in the coverage of the neurovascular bundle after vascular surgery.

As a functioning pedicled flap, the gracilis muscle can be transferred for the treatment of anal incontinence. This technique called graciloplasty was described in the 1950s by Pickrell and was revolutionized in the late 1980s by the introduction of chronic muscle electro-stimulation. The gracilis microsurgical free flap is commonly used in the reconstruction of upper and lower limbs, in breast reconstruction and – as a free functioning flap – to restore forearm function or in dynamic reconstruction of facial paralysis.

=== Transplantation sites ===
The muscle may be split to reduce bulk for facial reanimation, as well as to repair hand muscles. It can be used to fashion an external anal sphincter.

== Additional images ==
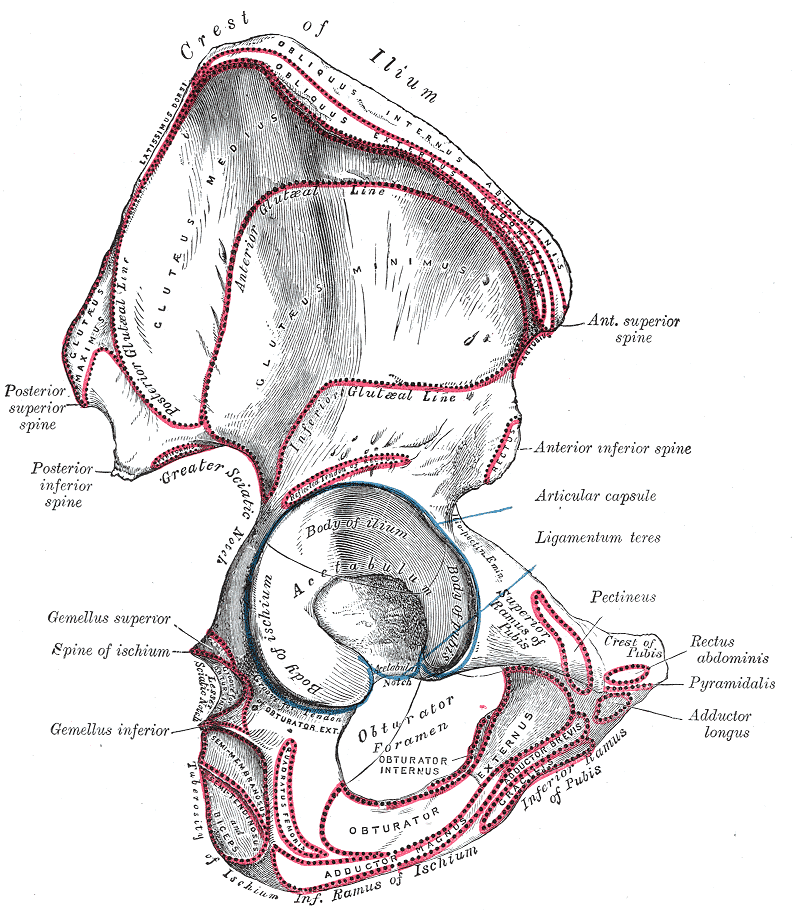
Right hip bone. External surface.

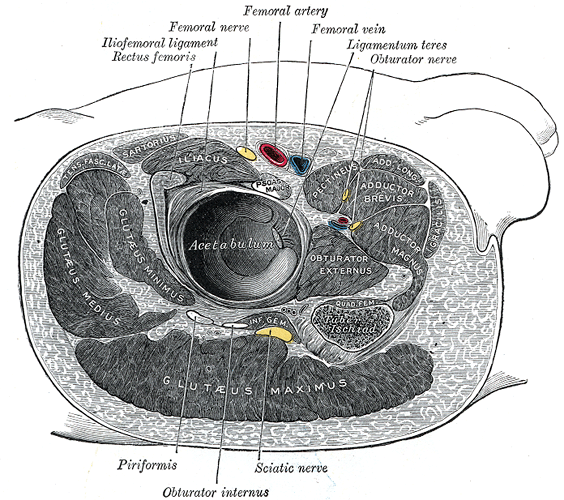
Structures surrounding right hip-joint.

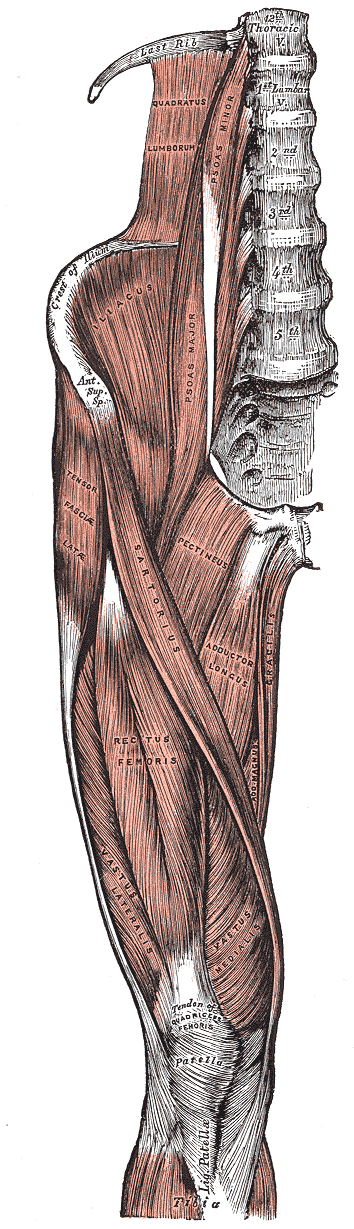
Muscles of the iliac and anterior femoral regions.

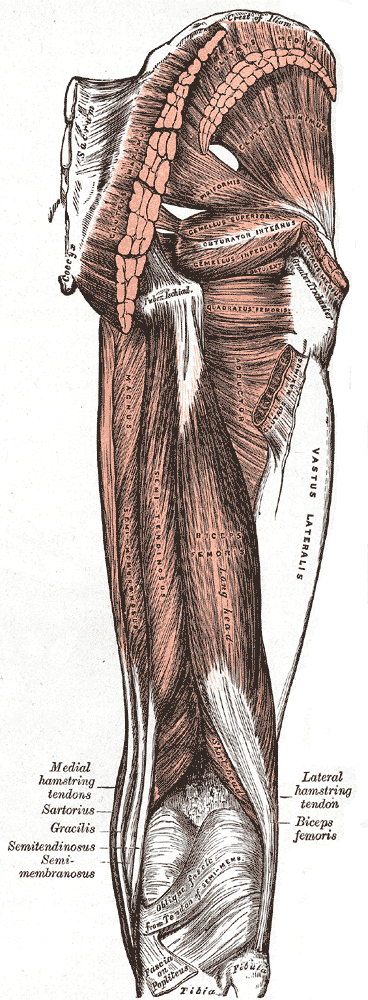
Muscles of the gluteal and posterior femoral regions.

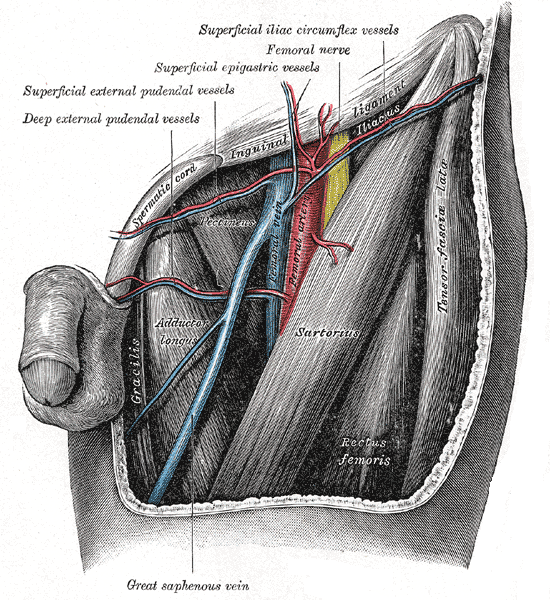
The left femoral triangle.

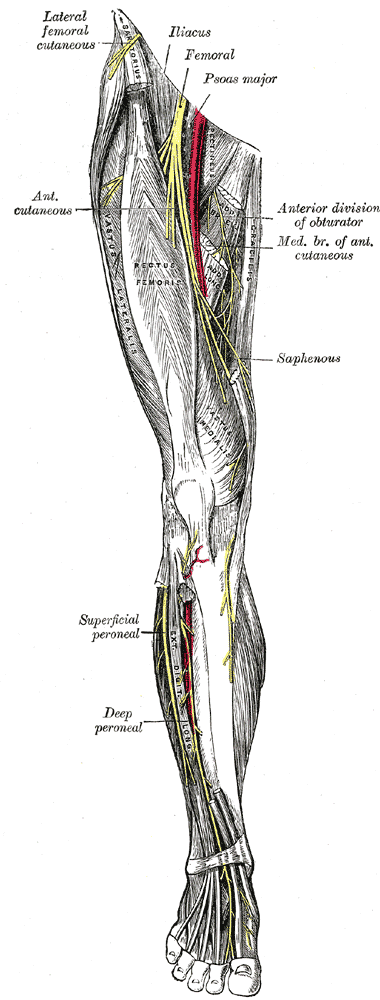
Nerves of the right lower extremity. Front view.

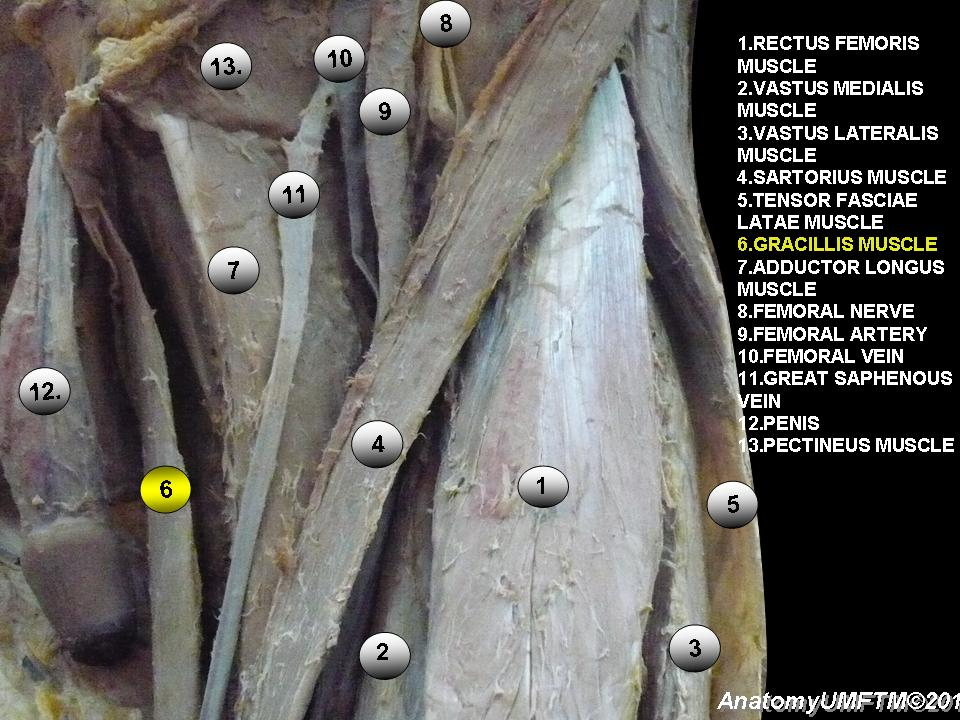
Gracilis muscle

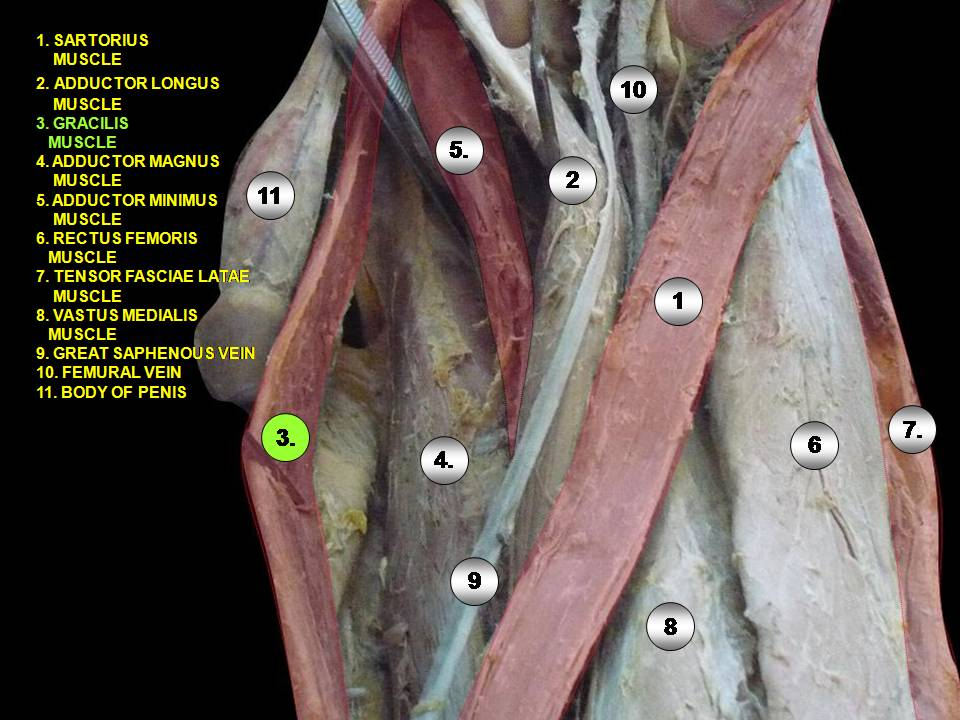
Gracilis muscle

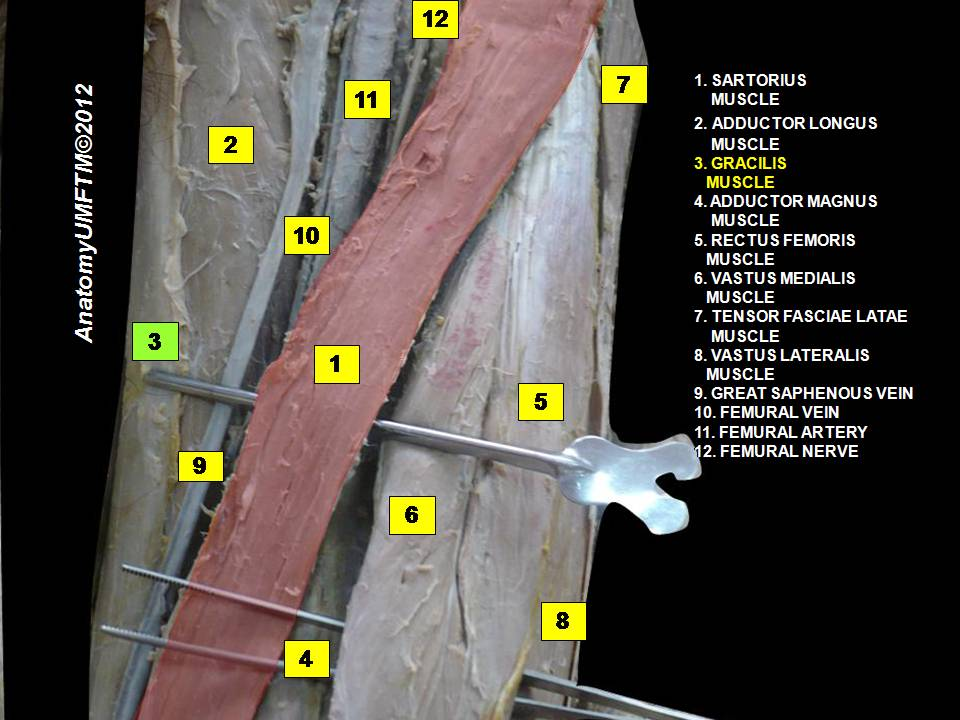
Gracilis muscle

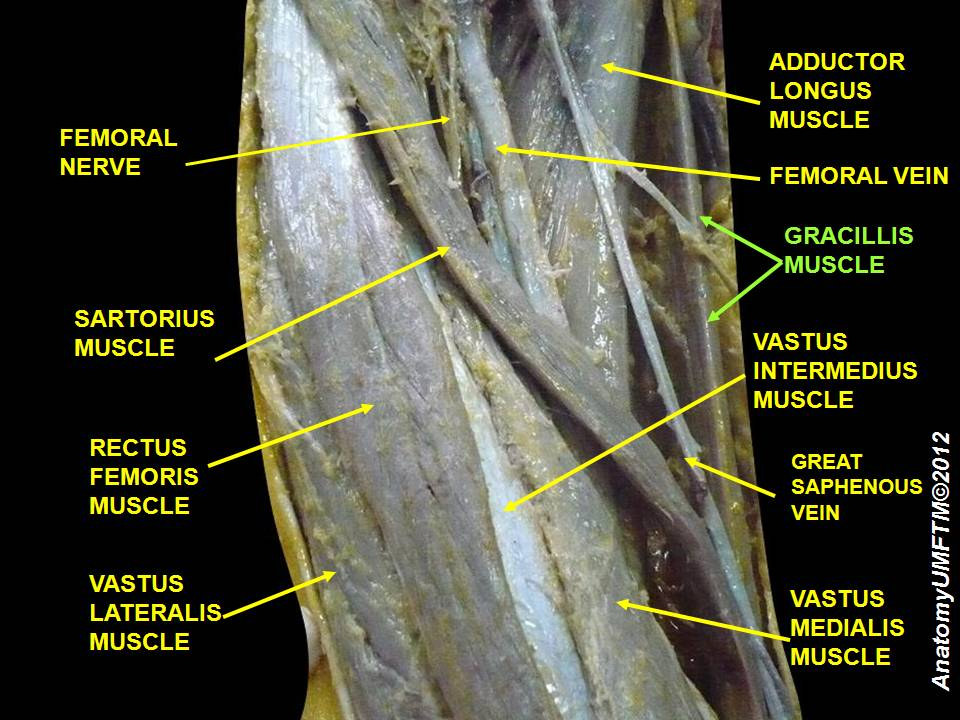
Gracilis muscle

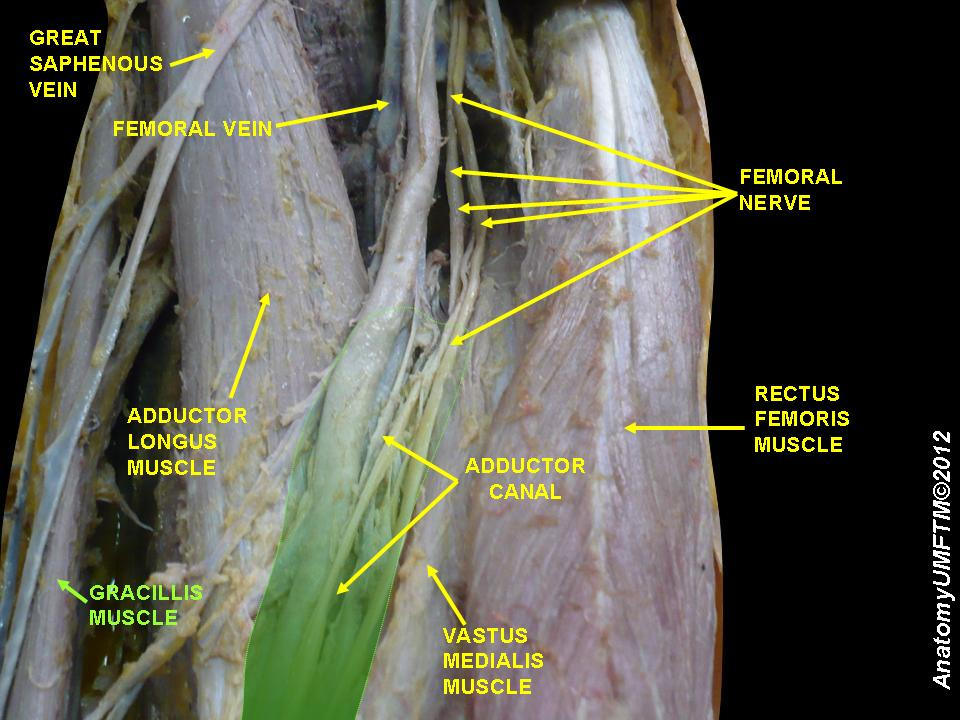
Gracilis muscle

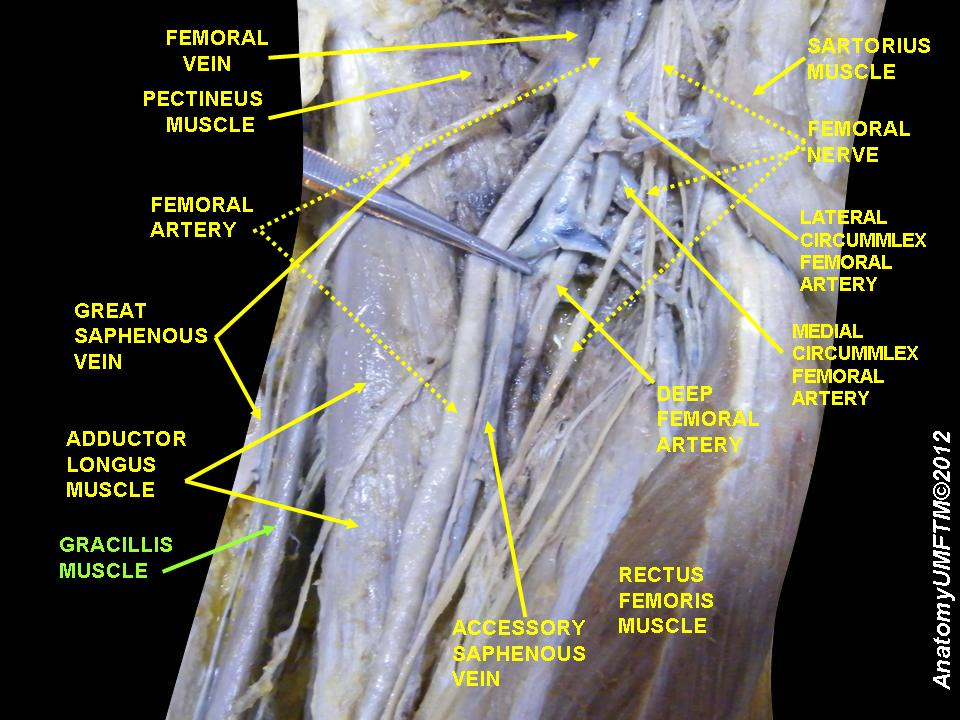
Gracilis muscle

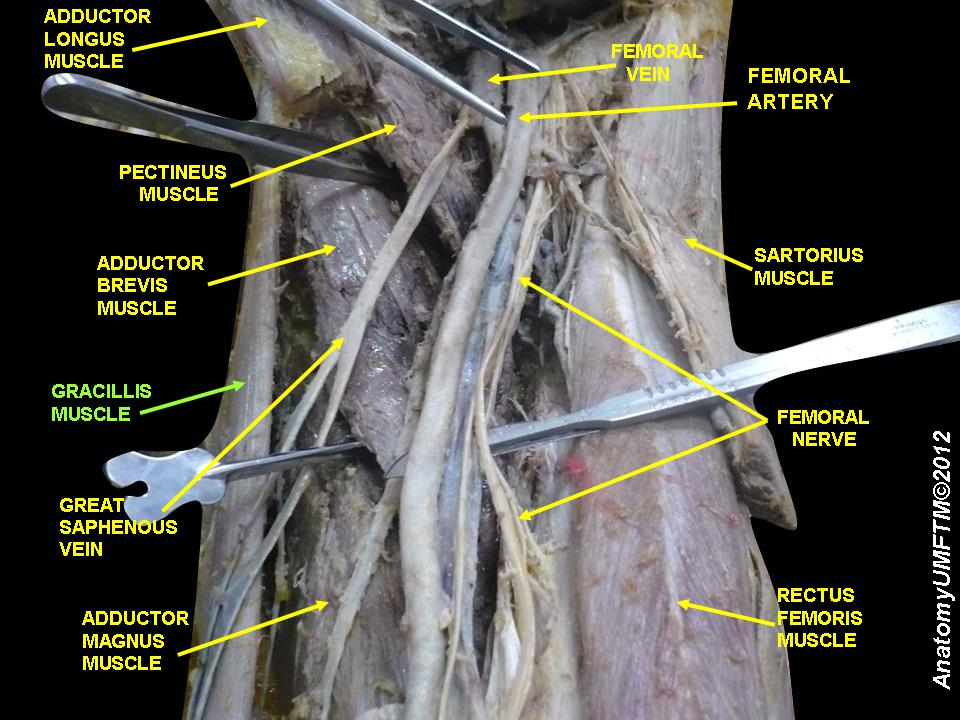
Gracilis muscle

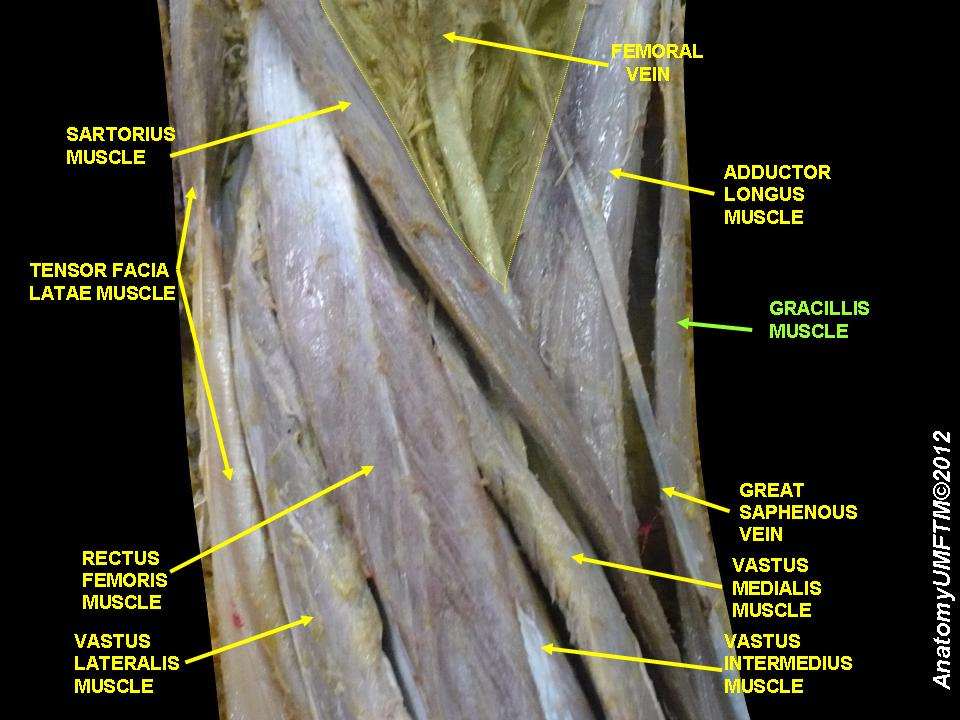
Gracilis muscle

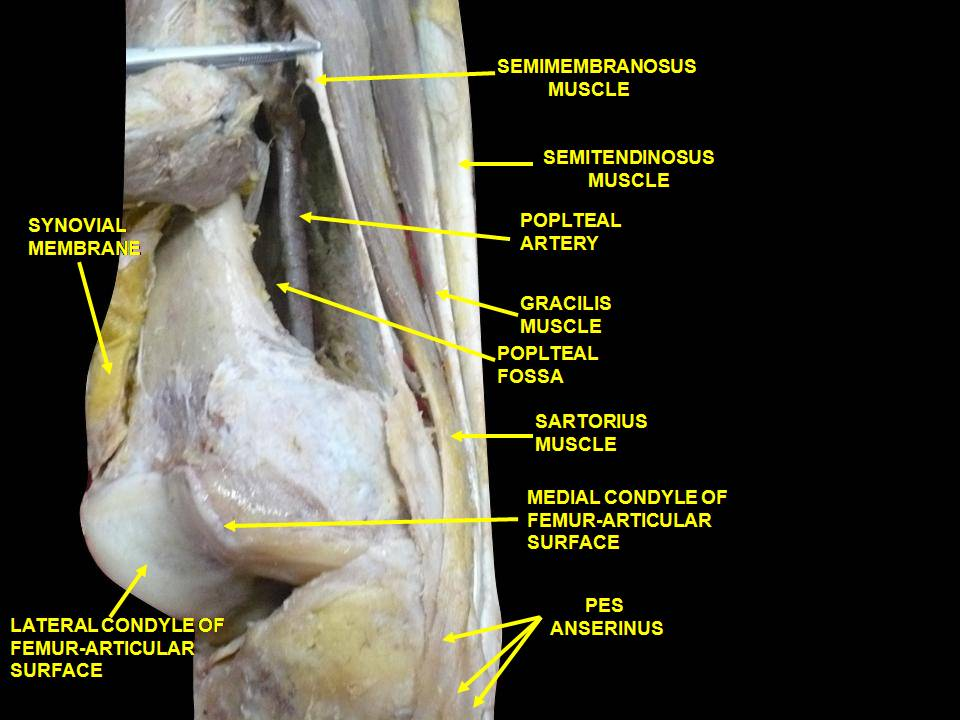
Muscles of thigh. Lateral view.

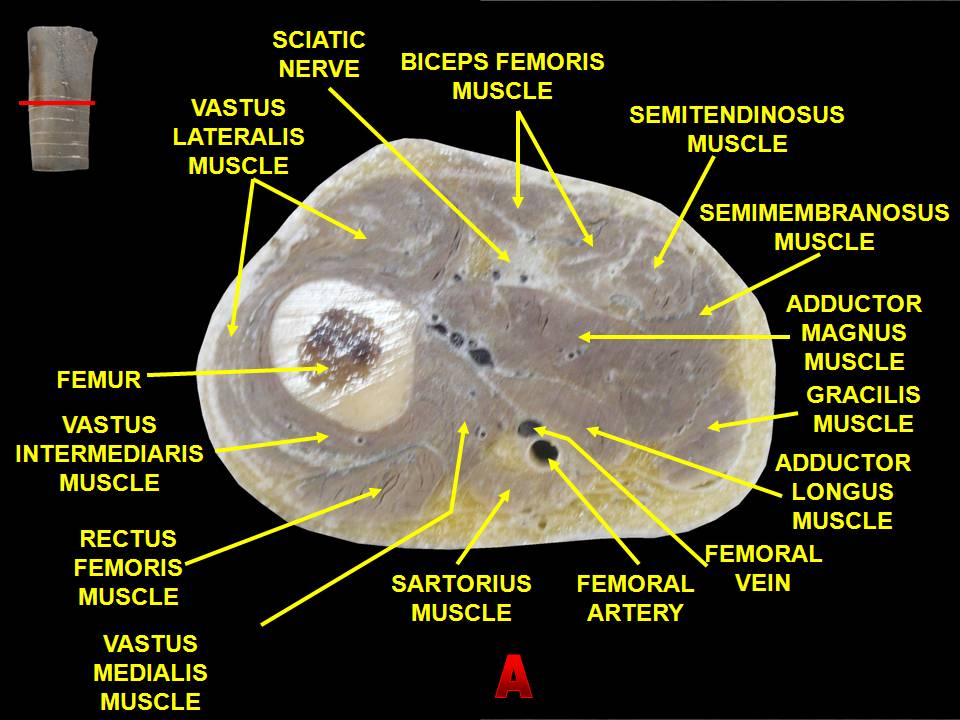
Muscles of thigh. Cross section.

== See also ==
Gracilis Muscles Clinical Role
