= Medial crural cutaneous branches of saphenous nerve =

- Cutaneous nerves of the right lower extremity. Front and posterior views. Saphenous, med. crural cut. labeled between legs and area filled in pink.

Details
- From: saphenous nerve

Identifiers
- Latin: rami cutanei cruris mediales nervi sapheni
- TA98: A14.2.07.025
- TA2: 6527
- FMA: 45328

The medial crural cutaneous branches of saphenous nerve provide cutaneous innervation to the medial leg.
