= Saphenous nerve =

Longest sensory branch of the femoral nerve

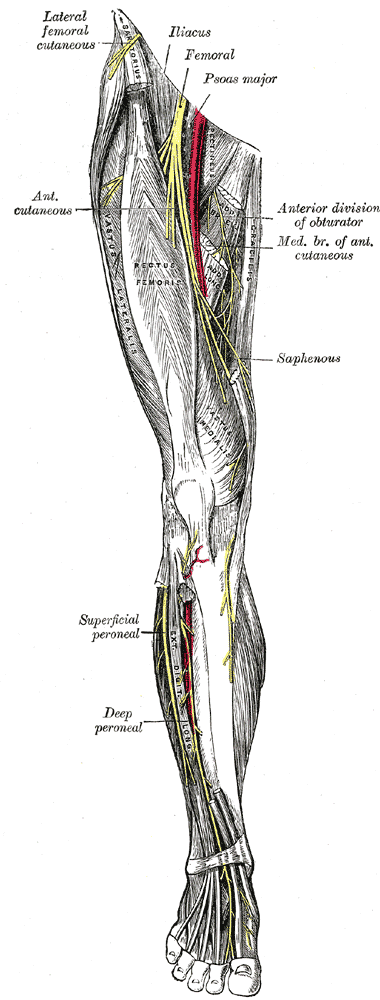
- Nerves of the right lower extremity. Front view. (Saphenous labeled at center right.)

Details
- From: Femoral nerve (L3, L4)

Identifiers
- Latin: nervus saphenus
- TA98: A14.2.07.023
- TA2: 6525
- FMA: 45262

The saphenous nerve (long or internal saphenous nerve) is the largest cutaneous branch of the femoral nerve. It is derived from the lumbar plexus (L3-L4). It is a strictly sensory nerve, and has no motor function. It commences in the proximal (upper) thigh and travels along the adductor canal. Upon exiting the adductor canal, the saphenous nerve terminates by splitting into two terminal branches: the sartorial nerve, and the infrapatellar nerve (which together innervate the medial, anteromedial, posteromedial aspects of the distal thigh). The saphenous nerve is responsible for providing sensory innervation to the skin of the anteromedial leg.

== Structure ==
It is purely a sensory nerve.

=== Origin ===
The saphenous nerve is the largest and terminal branch of the femoral nerve. It is derived from the lumbar plexus (L3-L4).

=== Course ===
Shortly after the femoral nerve passes under the inguinal ligament, it splits into anterior and posterior divisions by the passage of the lateral femoral circumflex artery (a branch of the profunda femoris artery). The posterior division then gives off the saphenous nerve as it converges with the femoral artery where it passes beneath the sartorius muscle. The saphenous nerve lies in front of the femoral artery, behind the aponeurotic covering of the adductor canal, as far as the opening in the lower part of the adductor magnus muscle. There it diverges from the artery, and emerges from behind the lower edge of the aponeurotic covering of the canal. It descends vertically along the medial side of the knee behind the sartorius muscle, pierces the fascia lata, between the tendons of the sartorius muscle and gracilis muscle. It becomes subcutaneous around 10 cm above the medial epicondyle of the femur.

The nerve then passes along the tibial side of the leg, accompanied by the great saphenous vein. It descends behind the medial border of the tibia, and, at the lower third of the leg, divides into two branches:

- one continues its course along the margin of the tibia, and ends at the ankle.
- the other passes in front of the ankle, and is distributed to the skin on the medial side of the foot, as far as the ball of the great toe, communicating with the medial branch of the superficial peroneal nerve.

=== Branches ===
The saphenous nerve, about the middle of the thigh, gives off a branch which joins the subsartorial plexus.

At the medial side of the knee it gives off a large infrapatellar branch, which pierces the sartorius muscle and fascia lata. It is distributed to the skin in front of the patella.

Below the knee, the branches of the saphenous nerve (medial crural cutaneous branches) are distributed to the skin of the front and medial side of the leg, communicating with the cutaneous branches of the femoral, or with filaments from the obturator nerve.

== Clinical significance ==
Procedures such as saphenous vein cutdown or orthopedic surgery that includes incisions or dissection over the distal tibia or medial malleolus can result in damage to the saphenous nerve, resulting in loss of cutaneous sensation in the medial leg. This is due to the intimate path that the saphenous nerve and the great saphenous vein travel. The saphenous nerve is also often damaged during vein harvest for bypass surgery and during trocar placement during knee arthroscopy. There appears to be occasional meaningful individual variation in the pathway of this nerve, such that the illustration of it done for Gray's Anatomy, for example, likely represents an unusual rather than usual course.

The saphenous nerve can experience entrapment syndrome from exercises involving the quadriceps or from prolonged walking or standing. It is characterized by a burning sensation in most patients. Pain often occurs at night, long after the physical exercise which induced it has stopped, and may be aggravated by climbing stairs. Usually, in this case, motor function of the lower leg will not be impaired. This is a key distinction between saphenous nerve neuropathy and lower back radiculopathy. Saphenous nerve neuropathy only demonstrates sensory alterations, while lumbar radiculopathy will affect the motor, sensory, and deep tendon reflexes of the lower leg.

== Additional images ==
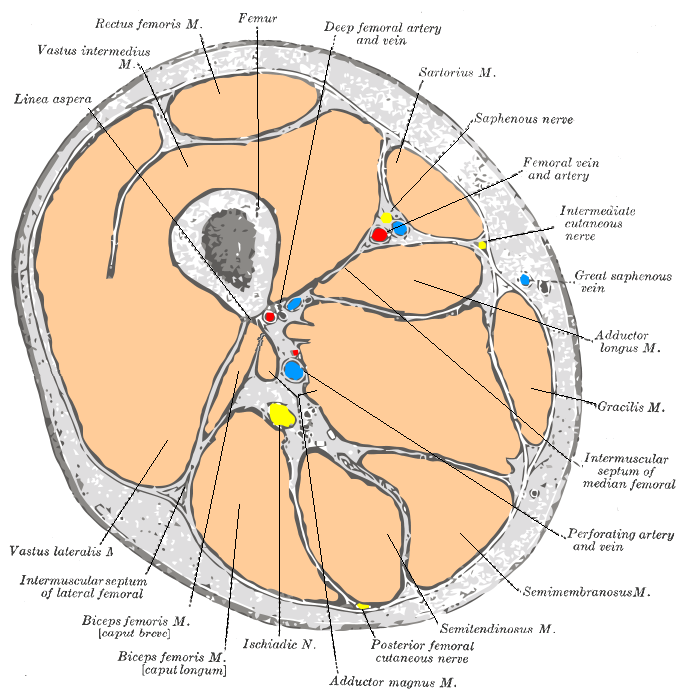
Cross-section through the middle of the thigh.

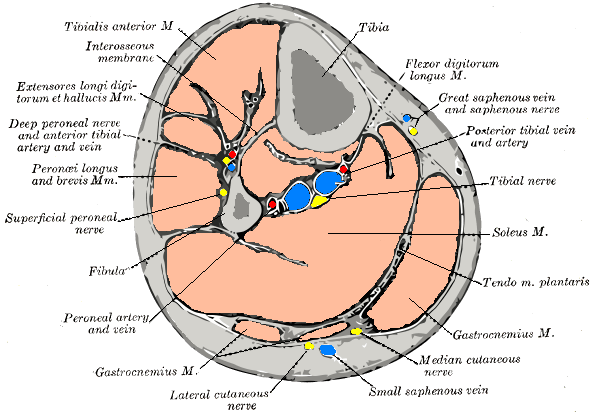
Cross-section through middle of leg.

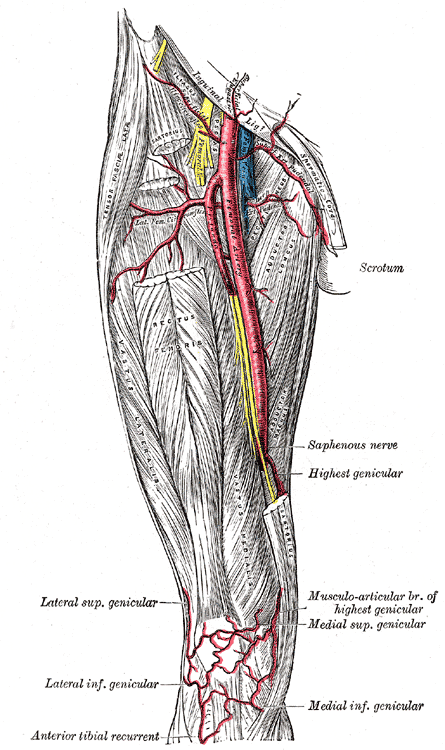
The femoral artery.

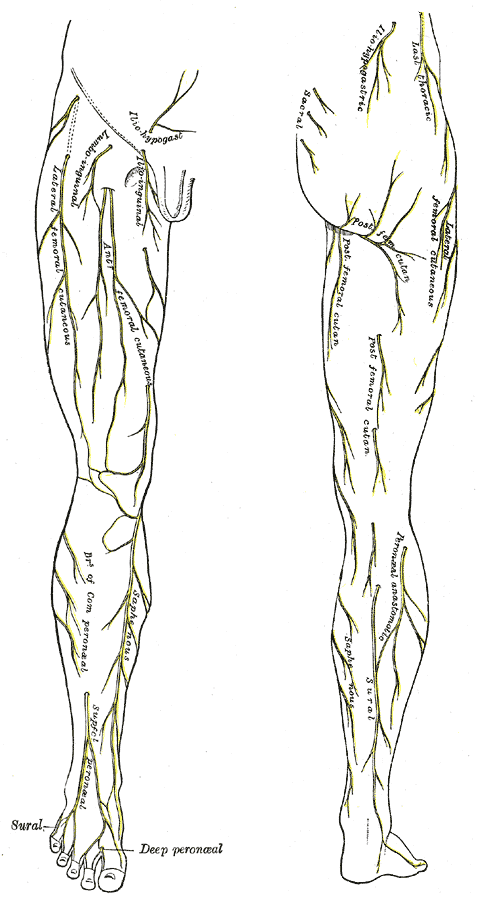
Cutaneous nerves of the right lower extremity. Front and posterior views.

Cutaneous nerves of the right lower extremity. Front and posterior views.

Diagram of the segmental distribution of the cutaneous nerves of the sole of the foot.

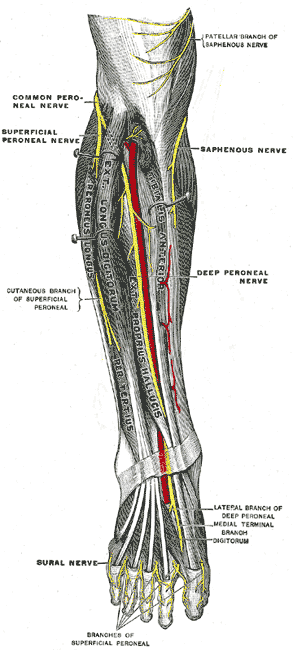
Deep nerves of the front of the leg.

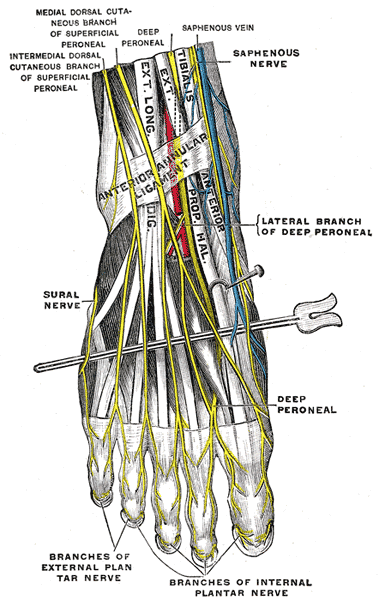
Nerves of the dorsum of the foot.
