= Sartorius muscle =

Longest muscle in the human body

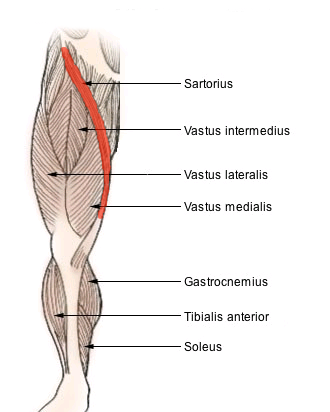
- Muscles of the right leg, viewed from the front. (Rectus femoris removed to reveal the vastus intermedius.)

Details
- Origin: Anterior superior iliac spine of the pelvic bone
- Insertion: Anteromedial surface of the proximal tibia in the pes anserinus
- Artery: Femoral artery
- Nerve: Femoral nerve (sometimes from the intermediate cutaneous nerve of thigh)
- Actions: Flexion, abduction, and lateral rotation of the hip, flexion of the knee

Identifiers
- Latin: musculus sartorius
- TA98: A04.7.02.015
- TA2: 2610
- FMA: 22353

The sartorius muscle (/sɑːrˈtɔːriəs/), historically known as couturier (French for "tailor"), is the longest muscle in the human body. It is a long, thin, superficial muscle that runs down the length of the thigh in the anterior compartment.

== Structure ==
The sartorius muscle originates from the anterior superior iliac spine, and part of the notch between the anterior superior iliac spine and anterior inferior iliac spine. It runs obliquely across the upper and anterior part of the thigh in an inferomedial direction. It passes behind the medial condyle of the femur to end in a tendon. This tendon curves anteriorly to join the tendons of the gracilis and semitendinosus muscles in the pes anserinus, where it inserts into the superomedial surface of the tibia.

Its upper portion forms the lateral border of the femoral triangle, and the point where it crosses adductor longus marks the apex of the triangle. Deep to sartorius and its fascia is the adductor canal, through which the saphenous nerve, femoral artery and vein, and nerve to vastus medialis pass.

=== Innervation ===
Like the other muscles in the anterior compartment of the thigh, the sartorius is innervated by the femoral nerve.

=== Variation ===
It may originate from the outer end of the inguinal ligament, the notch of the ilium, the ilio-pectineal line or the pubis.

The muscle may be split into two parts, and one part may be inserted into the fascia lata, the femur, the ligament of the patella or the tendon of the semitendinosus.

The tendon of insertion may end in the fascia lata, the capsule of the knee-joint, or the fascia of the leg.

The muscle may be absent in some people.

== Function ==
The sartorius muscle can move the hip joint and the knee joint, but all of its actions are weak, making it a synergist muscle. At the hip, it can flex, weakly abduct, and laterally rotate the femur. At the knee, it can flex the leg; when the knee is flexed, sartorius medially rotates the leg. Sitting cross-legged demonstrates all four actions of the sartorius.

== Clinical significance ==
One of the many conditions that can disrupt the use of the sartorius is pes anserine bursitis, an inflammatory condition of the medial portion of the knee. This condition usually occurs in athletes from overuse and is characterized by pain, swelling and tenderness. The pes anserinus involves the tendons of the gracilis, semitendinosus, and sartorius muscles; these tendons attach onto the anteromedial proximal tibia. When inflammation of the bursae underlying the tendons occurs, they separate from the head of the tibia.

== History ==
The name sartorius comes from the Latin word sartor, meaning tailor, and it is sometimes called the tailor's muscle. This name is likely in reference to the cross-legged position in which tailors once sat. Similarly in French, an older name for this muscle is "couturier" (seamstress or dressmaker), with similar reference to "sitting as a tailor" (in French: "s'asseoir en tailleur"). There are other hypotheses as to the origin of the name. One is that it refers to the location of the inferior portion of the muscle being the "inseam" or area of the inner thigh that tailors commonly measure when fitting trousers. Another is that the muscle closely resembles a tailor's ribbon. Additionally, antique sewing machines required continuous crossbody pedaling. This combination of lateral rotation and flexion of the hip and flexion of the knee gave tailors particularly developed sartorius muscles.

== Additional images ==
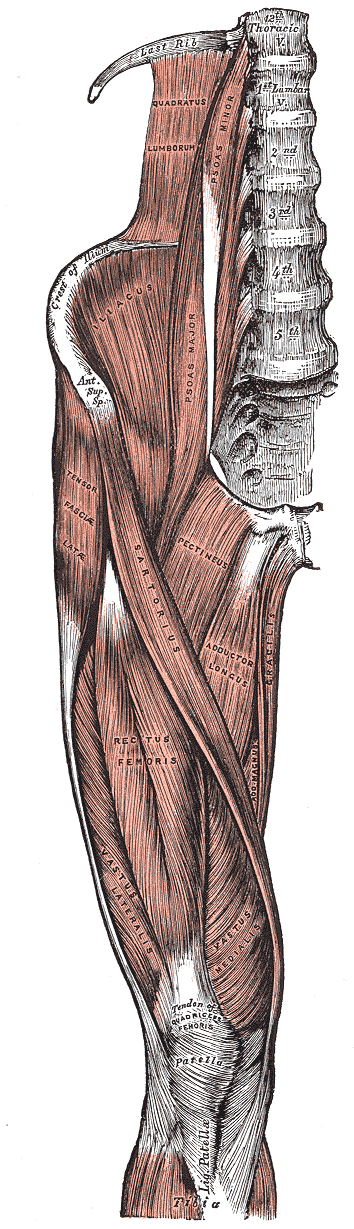
Muscles of the iliac and anterior femoral regions.

Cross-section through the middle of the thigh.

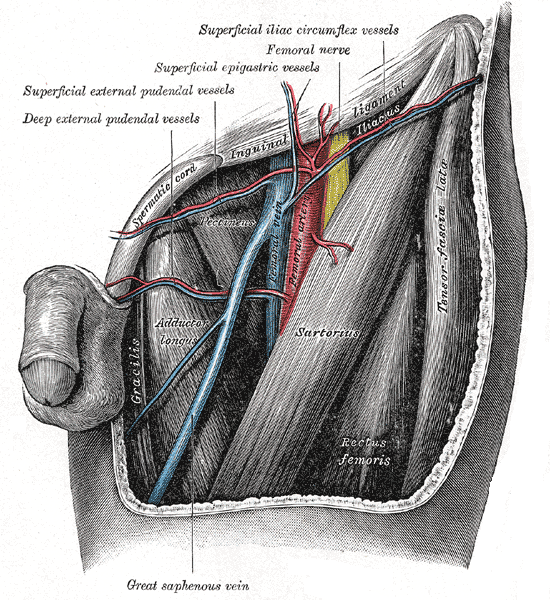
The left femoral triangle.

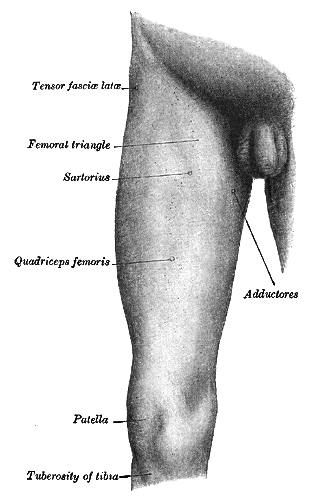
Front and medial aspect of right thigh.

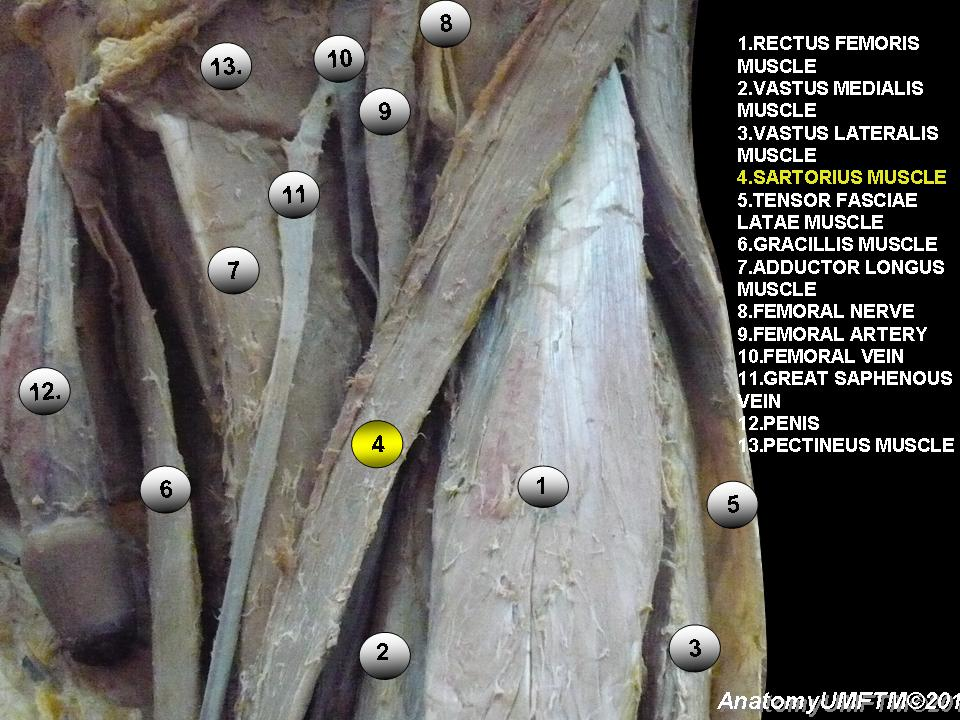

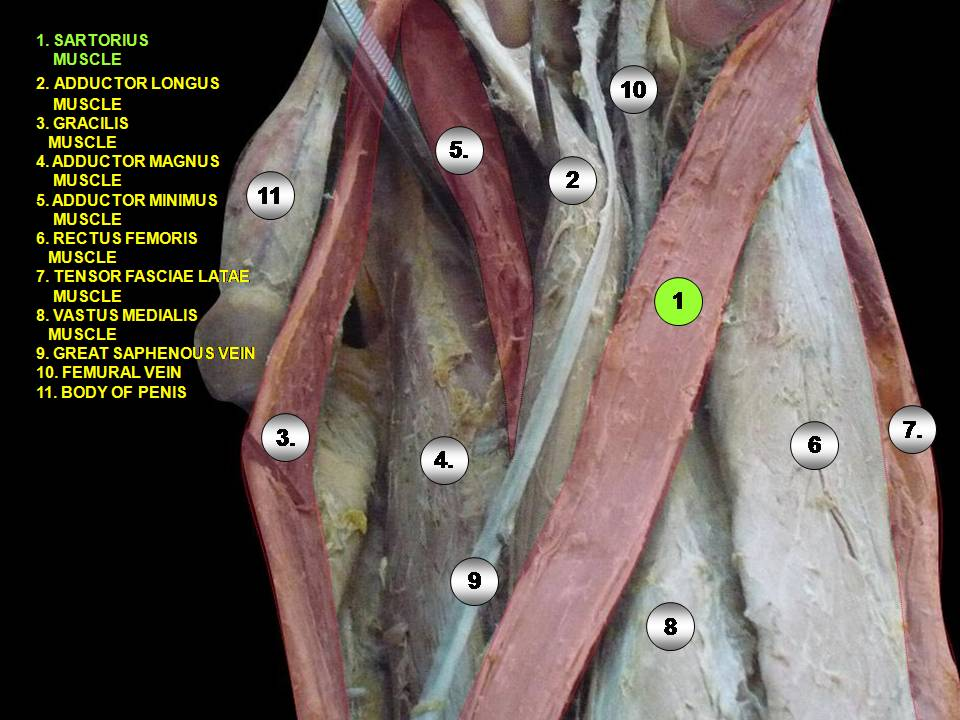
Sartorius muscle

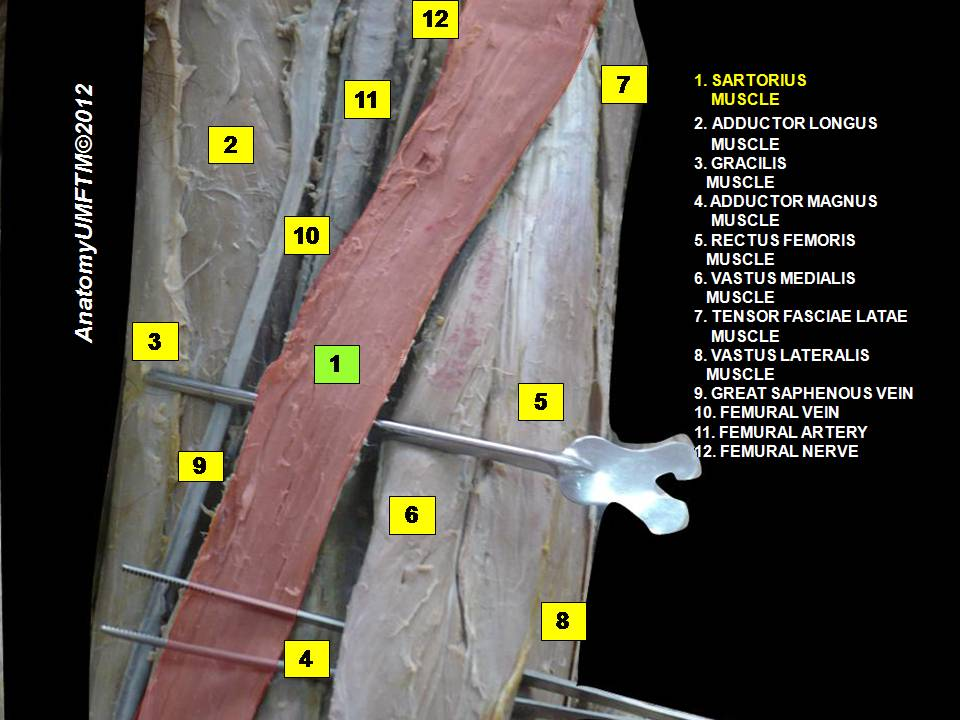
Sartorius muscle

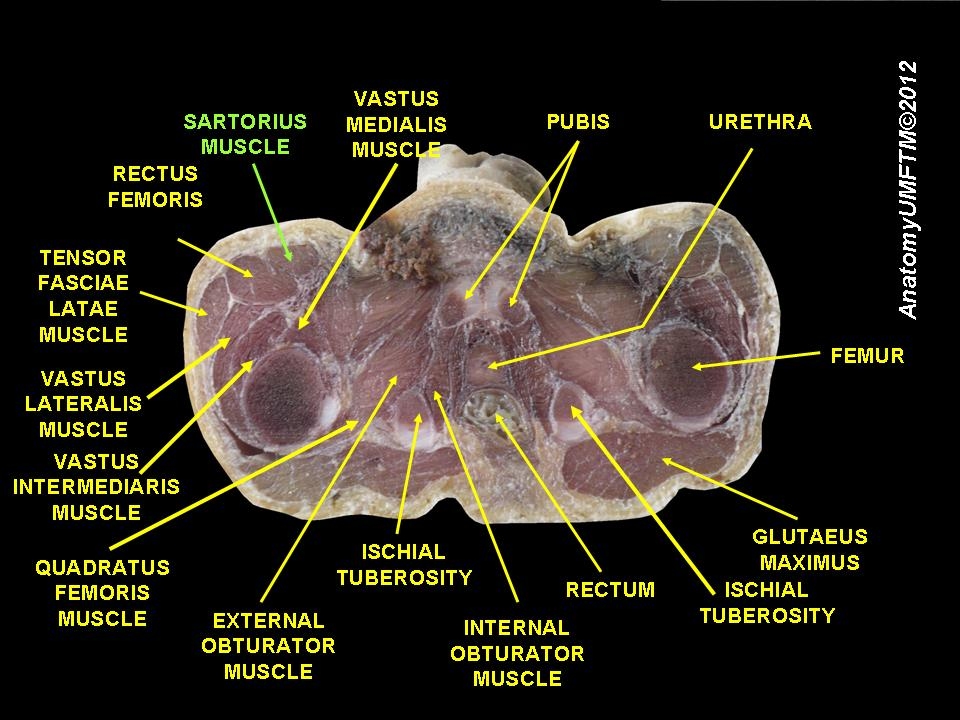
Sartorius muscle

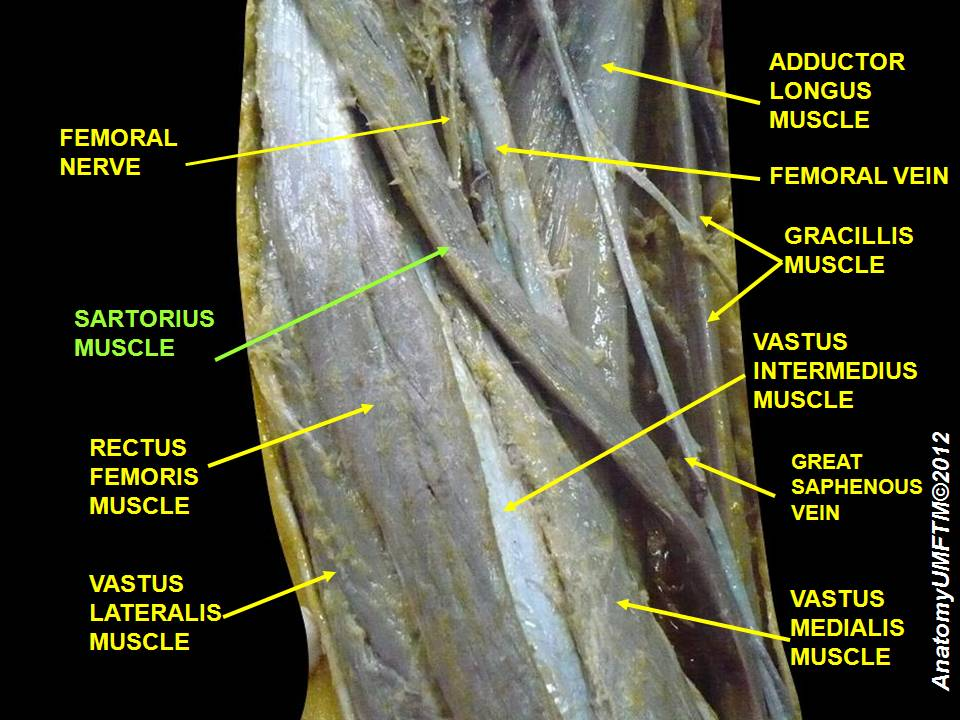
Sartorius muscle

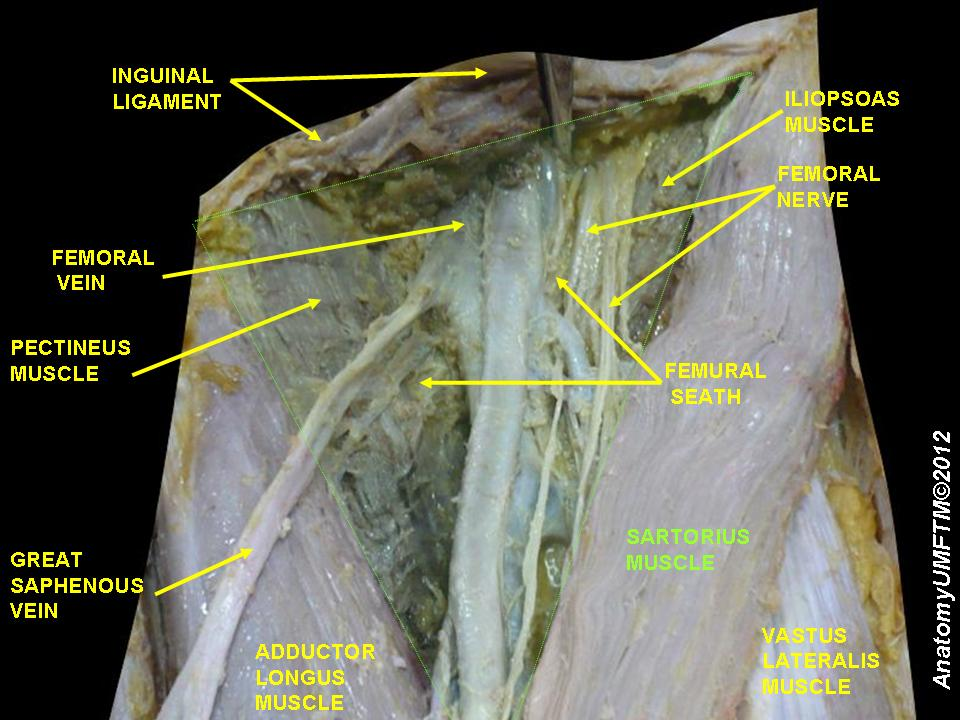
Sartorius muscle

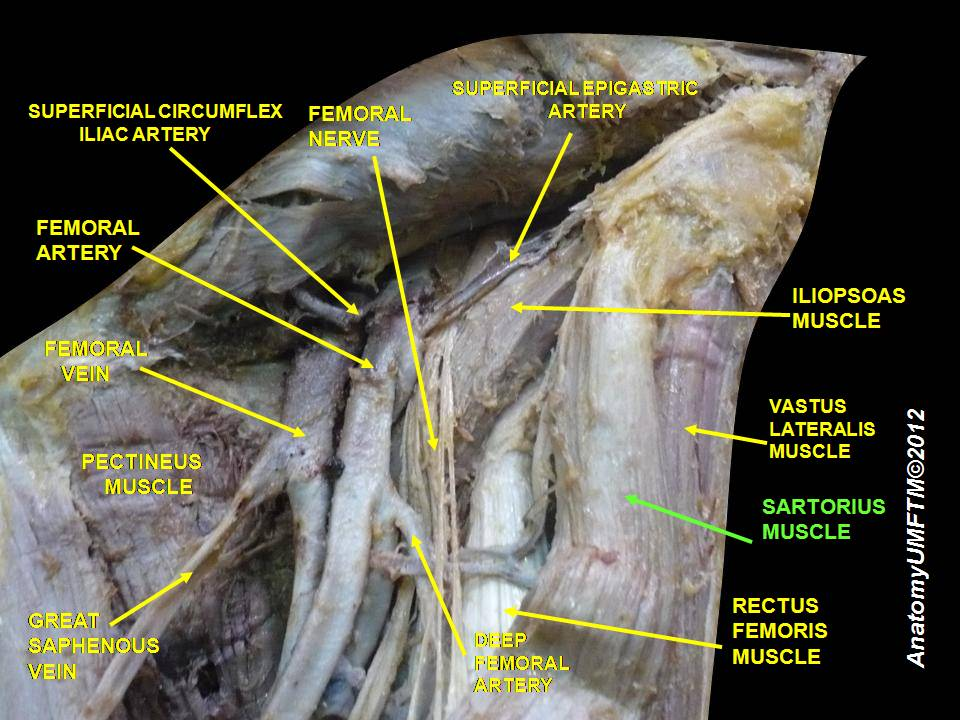
Sartorius muscle

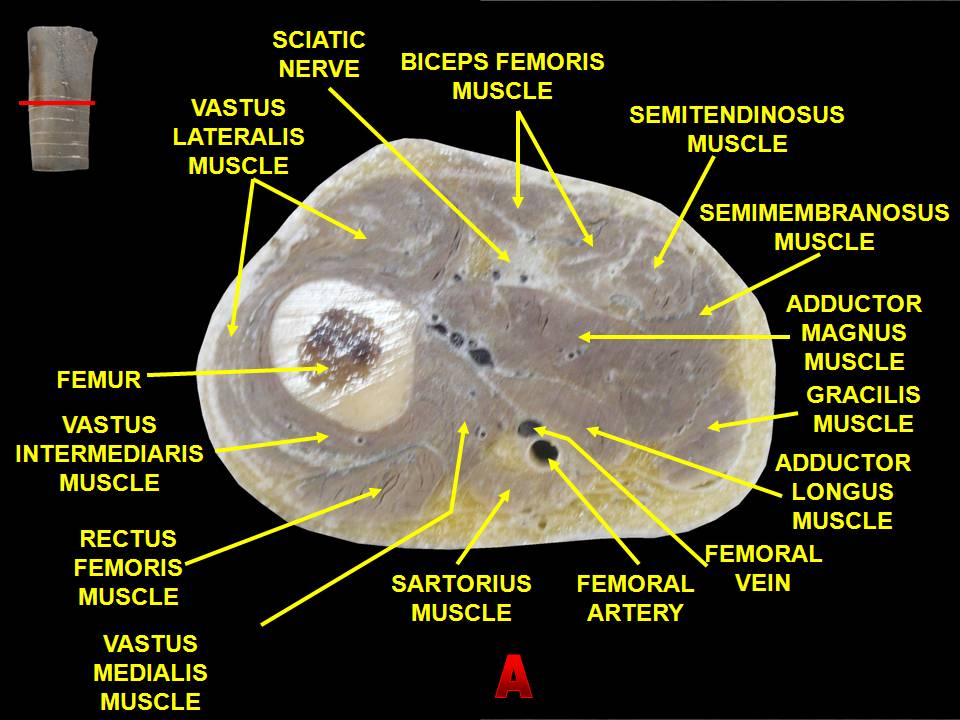
Muscles of thigh. Cross section.
