= Radial plane =

On the right, an axial slice through a human mandible as viewed on a CBCT. The three blue lines in the lower portion of the radiograph each portray radial slices. On the left, nine radial slices, three of which are represented by the blue lines on the right side.

A radial plane is an anatomical plane that is used to describe a virtual slice along a radius of a somewhat cylindrical shaped body part. The radial planes need not be perfectly drawn to overlap on an exact intersection point, particularly when the body part being sectioned is not a perfect cylinder, such as in the case of the maxilla and mandible.

== Usefulness ==
The radial plane can be useful because certain anatomical elements repeat in a circumferential manner (such as around the curvature of the dental arch (i.e. the jaw) and to speak of these entities using parallel planes becomes cumbersome and inaccurate.

For instance, the segment of bone on the outer circumference of each individual tooth is referred to as the facial plate of bone. Because the facial plate of bone is anterior to the incisors (in the front of the mouth) but lateral to the premolars and molars (in the back of the mouth), to visualize the facial plate of bone on various teeth will require sagittal slices for the former but coronal slices for the latter. To achieve greater uniformity and diminished confusion, simply speaking of radial slices provides a satisfactory solution for all teeth in both (upper and lower) arches.

Previous to the advent of this terminology, this plane was referred to as the axial plane relative to the body of the jawbone. It was believed that the jawbone was straightened out as though it were a straight tube, and then transverse (axial) sections were made of that tube.
