= Sagittal plane =

Anatomical plane dividing the body into left and right

- The main anatomical planes of the human body, including mid-sagittal or median (red), parasagittal (yellow), frontal or coronal plane (blue) and transverse or axial plane (green)

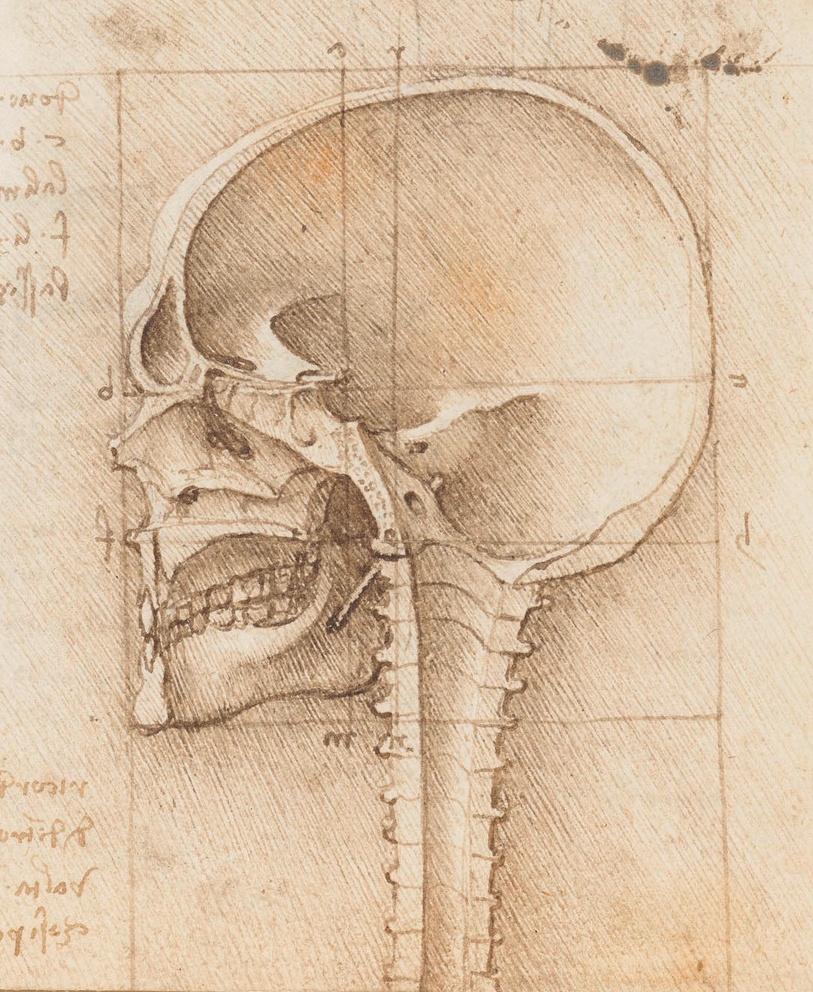
- Mid-sagittal section of a human skull, by Leonardo da Vinci, c. 1489

Details

Identifiers
- Latin: plana sagittalia
- TA98: A01.2.00.003
- TA2: 49
- FMA: 11361

The sagittal plane (/ˈsædʒɪtəl/; also known as the longitudinal plane) is an anatomical plane in bilaterians that divides the body into right and left sections. It is perpendicular to the transverse and coronal planes. The plane may be in the center of the body and divide it into two equal parts (mid-sagittal), or away from the midline and divide it into unequal parts (para-sagittal). The term "sagittal" was coined by Gerard of Cremona.

== Variations in terminology ==
Examples of sagittal planes include:

- The terms median plane or mid-sagittal plane are sometimes used to describe the sagittal plane running through the midline. This plane cuts the body into halves (assuming bilateral symmetry), passing through midline structures such as the navel and spine. It is one of the planes which, combined with the umbilical plane, defines the four quadrants of the human abdomen.
- The term parasagittal is used to describe any plane parallel or adjacent to a given sagittal plane. Specific named parasagittal planes include:
  - The midclavicular line crosses through the clavicle.
  - Lateral sternal and parasternal planes.

The term sagittal derives from the Latin word sagitta, meaning "arrow". An image of an arrow piercing a body and passing from front (anterior) to back (posterior) on a parabolic trajectory with the upright bow that shot it would be one way to demonstrate the derivation of the term. Another explanation would involve the notching of the sagittal suture posteriorly by the lambdoidal suture —similar to feathers on an arrow. The Oxford English Dictionary indicates that sagittal in the sense of the sagittal suture along the vertex of the skull pre-dates other anatomical usage.

- Sagittal axis or anterior-posterior axis is the axis perpendicular to the coronal plane, i.e., the one formed by the intersection of the sagittal and the transversal planes
- Coronal axis, medial-lateral axis, or frontal axis is the axis perpendicular to the sagittal plane, i.e., the one formed by the intersection of the coronal and the transversal planes.
- flexion and extension are the movements of limbs within the sagittal plane. This also includes dorsiflexion, plantar flexion, and hyperextension.
- Abduction and adduction are terms for movements of limbs within the coronal plane.

== Additional images ==
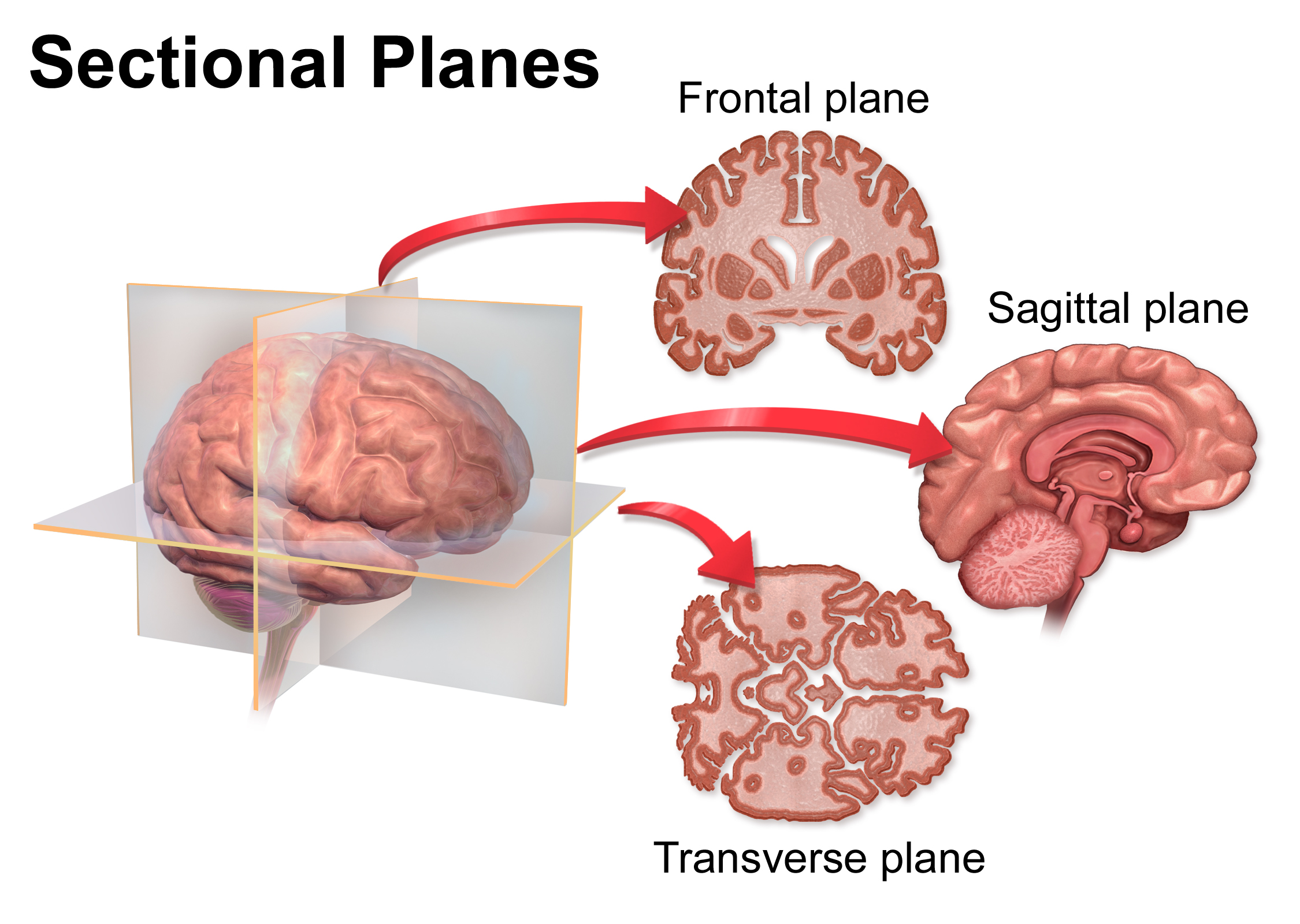
Sectional planes of the brain

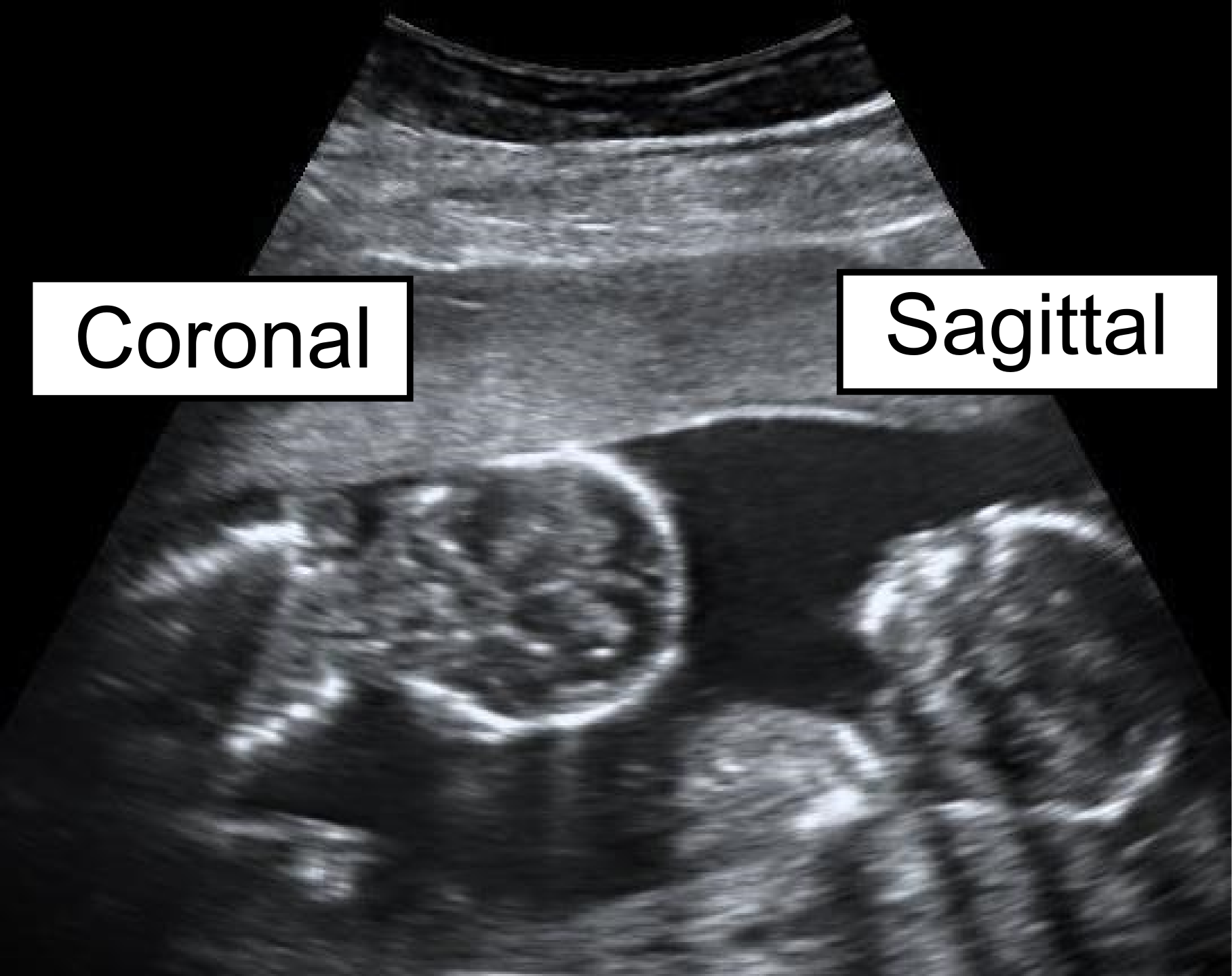
Identical twins at a gestational age of 15 weeks, shown in coronal and sagittal plane, respectively

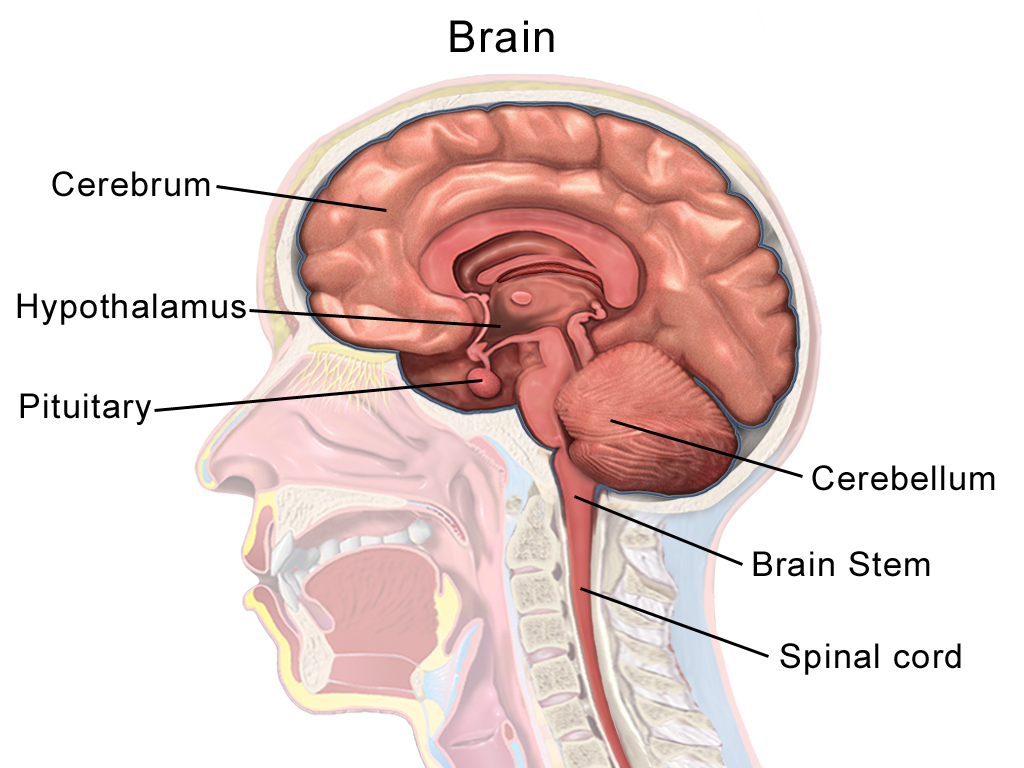
Brain anatomy (sagittal)

== See also ==
- Anatomical terms of location
- Coronal plane
- Transverse plane
- Sagittal sign
