= Transverse plane =

Anatomical plane that divides the body into superior and inferior parts

A transverse plane is a plane that is rotated 90° from two other planes.

== Anatomy ==
Transverse plane

Details

Identifiers
- Latin: plana transversalia
- TA98: A01.2.00.006
- TA2: 52
- FMA: 12247 71928, 12247

The transverse plane is an anatomical plane that is perpendicular to the sagittal plane and the coronal plane. It is also called the axial plane or horizontal plane, especially in human anatomy, but horizontal plane can be misleading with other animals. The plane splits the body into a cranial (head) side and caudal (tail) side, so in humans the plane will be horizontal (dividing the body into superior and inferior sections) but in quadrupeds it will be vertical.

== Human anatomy ==
=== Clinically relevant anatomical planes ===
- Transverse thoracic plane (also plane of Louis)
- Xiphosternal plane (or xiphosternal junction)
- Transpyloric plane
- Subcostal plane
- Umbilical plane (or transumbilical plane)
- Supracristal plane
- Intertubercular plane (or transtubercular plane)
- Interspinous plane

==== Associated structures ====
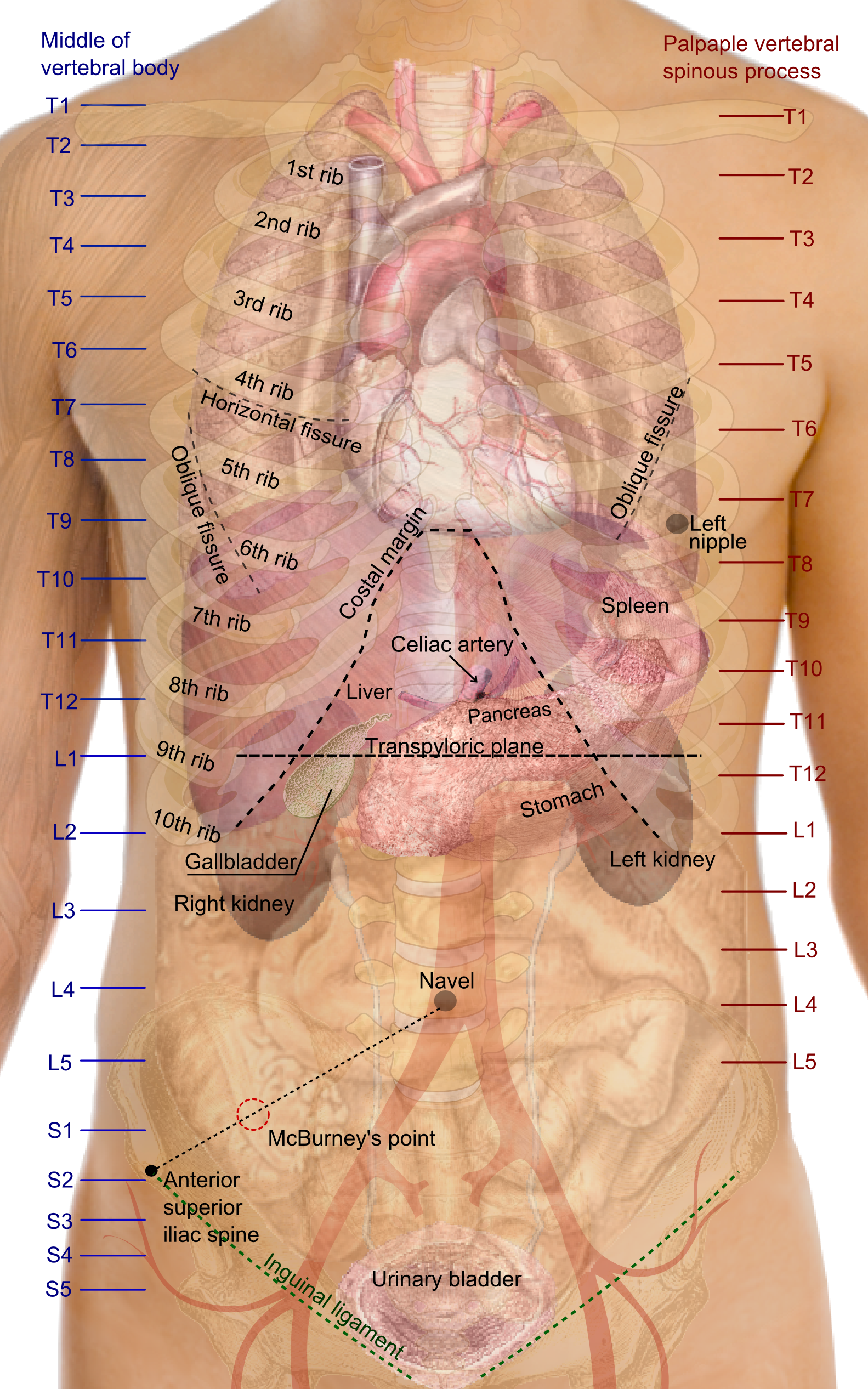
Surface projections of the major organs of the trunk, using the vertebral column and rib cage as main reference points of surface anatomy. The transpyloric plane is given near center.

- The transverse thoracic plane
  - Plane through T4 & T5 vertebral junction and sternal angle of Louis.
  - Marks the:
    - Attachment of costal cartilage of rib 2 at the sternal angle;
    - Aortic arch (beginning and end);
    - Upper margin of SVC;
    - Thoracic duct crossing;
    - Tracheal bifurcation;
    - Pulmonary trunk bifurcation;
- The xiphosternal plane (a.k.a. xiphosternal junction)
  - Anterior, inferior limit of thoracic cavity;
  - Marks the:
    - Superior surface of the liver;
    - Respiratory diaphragm;
    - Inferior border of the heart;
- The transpyloric plane
  - Plane located halfway between the jugular notch and the upper border of the symphysis pubis;
  - Typically located at the lower border of L1;
  - Cuts through the pylorus and the tips of the ninth costal cartilages;
- The subcostal plane
  - Transverse plane through the inferior border of costal margin;
  - Typically located at the superior border of L3, or transects L3;
- The umbilical plane (or transumbilical plane)
  - Located at the level of L3/L4 vertebral junction or IV disc;
- The supracristal plane
  - Located at the level of L4;
  - Marks bifurcation of aorta;
  - Most superior aspect of iliac crest;
- The intertubercular plane (a.k.a. Transtubercular plane)
  - Located at the level of L5;
  - Marks origin of IVC;
- The interspinous plane
  - Transverse plane which transverses the anterior superior iliac spines.
  - Typically located at the level of S1.

== Engineering usages ==
- With gears a transverse plane is perpendicular to the axial plane and to the pitch plane.
- With an MRI machine the plane perpendicular to the direction of the main magnetic field is called the transverse plane.

== Other animals ==
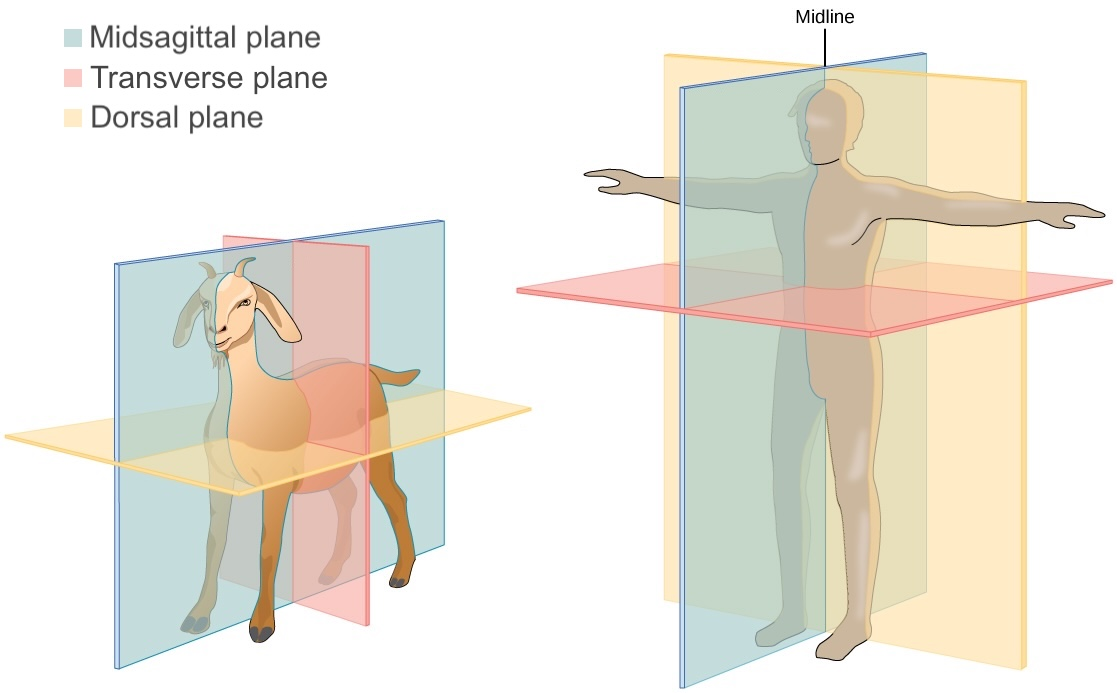
The standard anatomical planes of both a human and a goat displaying three anatomical planes: the median plane the transverse plane the coronal plane (dorsal plane in quadrupeds)

In quadrupeds the coronal plane is called the dorsal plane.

== See also ==
- Anatomical terms of location
- Horizontal plane
- Coronal plane
- Sagittal plane
