= Supracristal plane =

Supracristal plane (Planum supracristale) (or supracrestal plane) is an anatomical transverse plane lying at the upper most part of the pelvis, the iliac crest. According to Gray's Anatomy, this anatomical plane crosses the upper border of the spinous process of L4 (fourth lumbar vertebra). It lies about half an inch below the level of the transumbilical plane and therefore passes through the umbilical region and the left and right lumbar regions.

== Clinical significance ==
The supracristal plane can be used as a landmark for several nerve branches, as well as an approximate marker for the umbilicus (belly button). It is also used as the divider between the lower (left and right) and upper (left and right) quadrants of the abdomen (where the vertical midline divides left from right).

It is also the level where the abdominal aorta bifurcates into the left and right common iliac artery and just superior to the union of the common iliac veins.

It can help in the identification of the level of L3/L4 where a lumbar puncture can be done safely.

== See also ==
- Interspinous plane
- Intertubercular plane
- Quadrants and regions of abdomen
- Subcostal plane
- Transpyloric plane
- Transumbilical plane
