= Mallet-Guy's sign =

- Differential diagnosis: pancreatitis

Mallet-Guy's sign is a medical sign to detect signs of pancreatitis. It is pain elicited with deep palpation of the left subcostal and epigastric region, suggesting pancreatic inflammation. It is named after Pierre Mallet-Guy.
