= RUQ =

RUQ or ruq may refer to:

- Megleno-Romanian language (ISO 639-3 language code)
- right upper quadrant of the human abdomen
