= Epigastrium =

Upper central region of the abdomen

- Surface lines of the front of the thorax and abdomen

Details
- Part of: abdomen

Identifiers
- Latin: regio epigastrica
- TA98: A01.2.04.003
- TA2: 257
- FMA: 20389

In anatomy, the epigastrium (or epigastric region) is the upper central region of the abdomen. It is located between the costal margins and the subcostal plane. Pain may be referred to the epigastrium from damage to structures derived from the foregut.

== Structure ==
The epigastrium is one of the nine regions of the abdomen, along with the right and left hypochondria, right and left lateral regions (lumbar areas or flanks), right and left inguinal regions (or fossae), and the umbilical and pubic regions. It is located between the costal margins and the subcostal plane.

During breathing, the diaphragm contracts and flattens, displacing the viscera and producing an outward movement of the upper abdominal wall (epigastric region). It is a convergence of the diaphragm and the abdominals, so that "when both sets of muscles (diaphragm and abdominals) tense, the epigastrium pushes forward". Therefore, the epigastric region is not a muscle nor is it an organ, but it is a zone of activity where the actions of the rectus abdominis and the diaphragm produce an outward bulging of the upper abdominal wall.

=== Contents ===
The epigastrium lies over a number of structures in the abdomen. Part of the liver lies in the right of the epigastrium. It also lies over the duodenum, the edge of the spleen, part of the stomach, and part of the pancreas.

== Clinical significance ==
The epigastrium is the part of the abdomen where abdominal thrusts (the Heimlich manoeuvre) are able to produce a rapid and forceful exhalation of breath.

Palpation of the epigastrium can be used to feel the structures below it. This includes the liver, and the stomach. An aortic aneurysm may be felt as a mass in the epigastrium.

Stomach sounds may be heard when auscultating (using a stethoscope) on the epigastrium.

=== Pain ===
Pain can be referred to the epigastrium from damaged internal organs. This is primarily from the foregut, with structures including the stomach, parts of the duodenum, and the biliary tract. Pain may also be referred from the pancreas, such as in acute pancreatitis.
