= Midsternal line =

Part of the surface anatomy of the anterior thorax

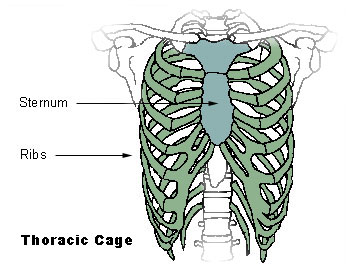
- Thoracic cage

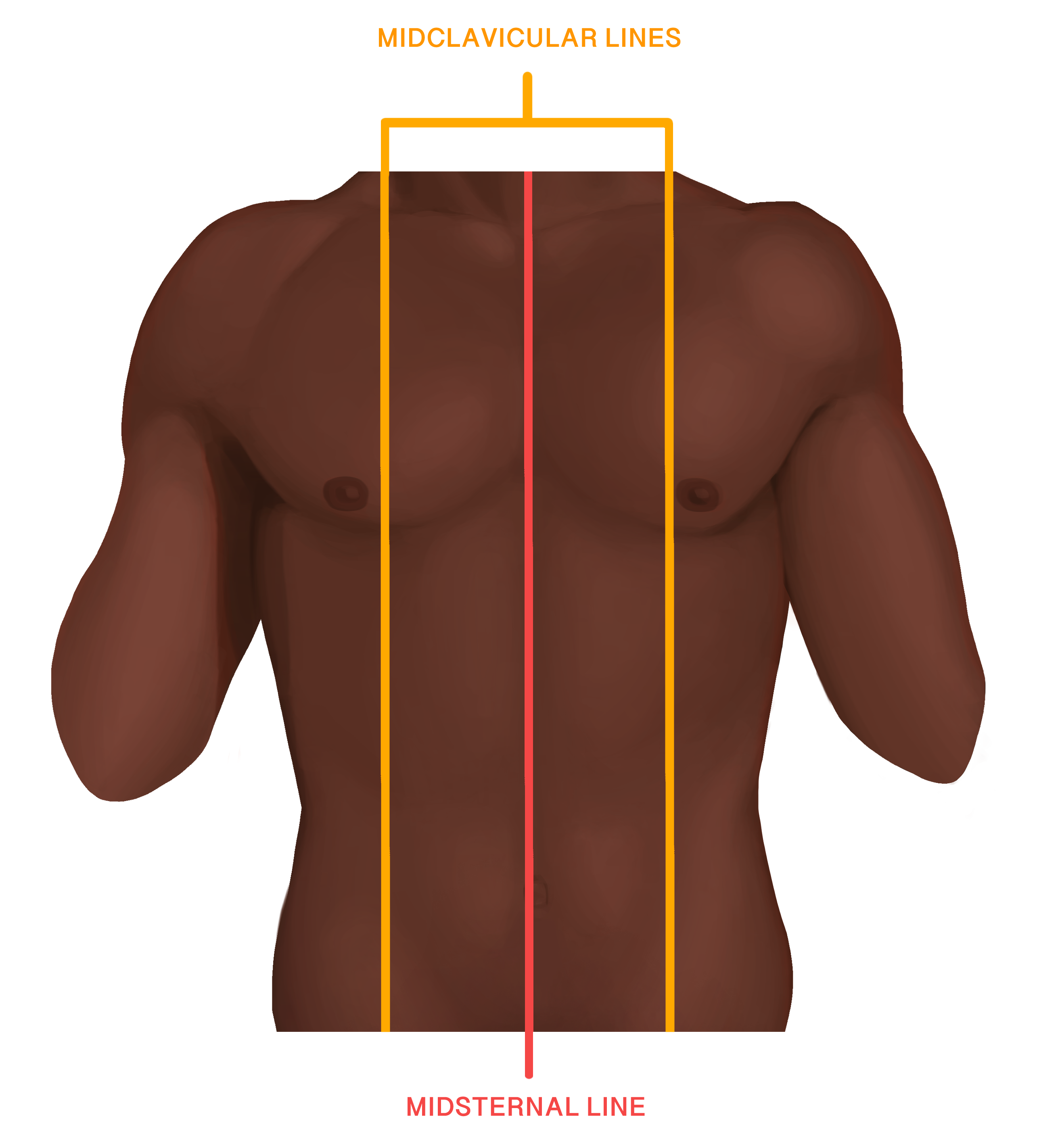
- Surface lines of the anterior thorax. The midsternal line is visible at the center, running vertically.

The midsternal line is used to describe a part of the surface anatomy of the anterior thorax. The midsternal line runs vertical down the middle of the sternum.

It can be interpreted as a component of the median plane.

== See also ==
- Midclavicular line
