= Intertubercular plane =

Transverse plane in anatomy of hominid abdomen

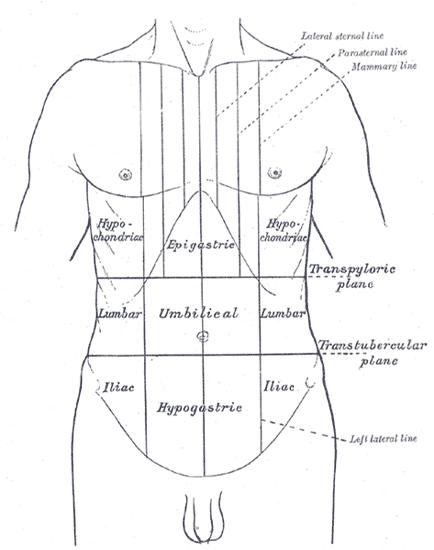
- Surface lines of the front of the thorax and abdomen. (Transtubercular is bottom horizontal line.)

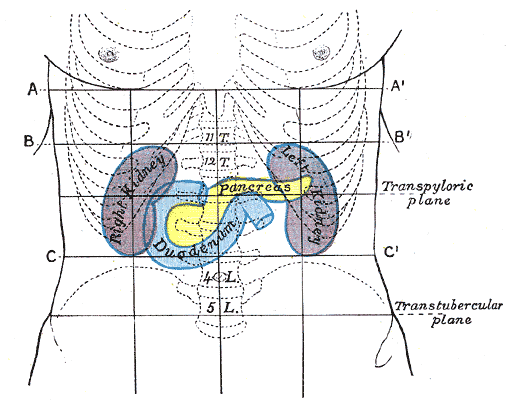
- Front of abdomen, showing surface markings for duodenum, pancreas, and kidneys.

Details

Identifiers
- Latin: planum intertuberculare
- TA98: A01.2.00.010
- TA2: 57
- FMA: 74566

A lower transverse plane midway between the upper transverse and the upper border of the pubic symphysis; this is termed the intertubercular plane (or transtubercular), since it practically corresponds to that passing through the iliac tubercles; behind, its plane cuts the upper border of the fifth lumbar vertebra (L5).

== Additional images ==
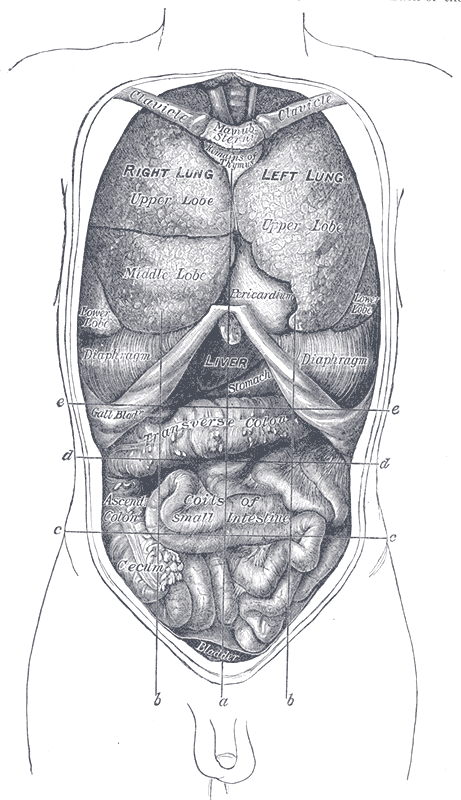
Front view of the thoracic and abdominal viscera.
a. Median plane.
b. Lateral planes.
c. Trans tubercular plane.
d. Subcostal plane.
e. Transpyloric plane.

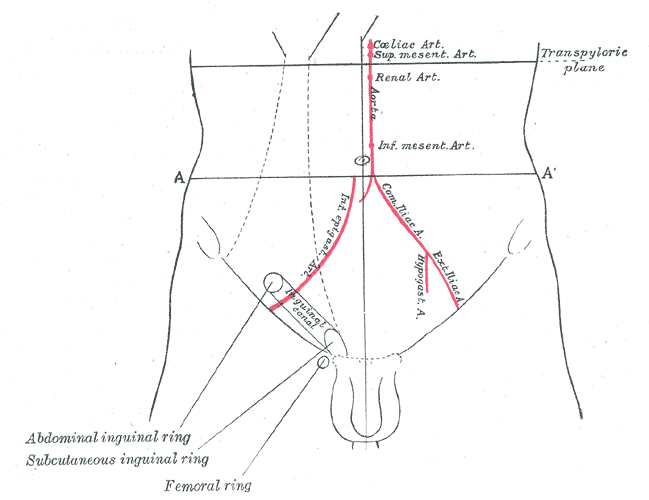
Front of abdomen, showing surface markings for arteries and inguinal canal.

== See also ==
- Quadrants and regions of abdomen
- Interspinous plane
- Subcostal plane
- Supracristal plane
- Transpyloric plane
- Transumbilical plane
