= Subcostal plane =

Anatomical plane

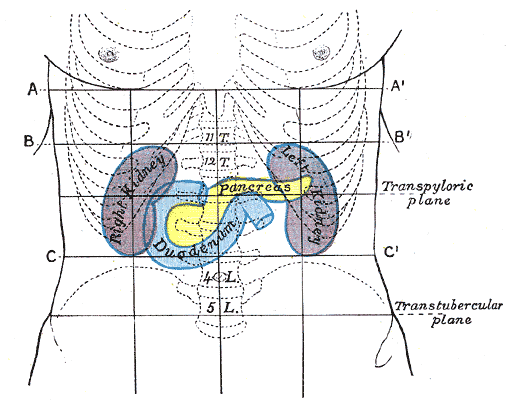
- Front of abdomen, showing surface markings for duodenum, pancreas, and kidneys. (Subcostal plane is approximately at level of "C")

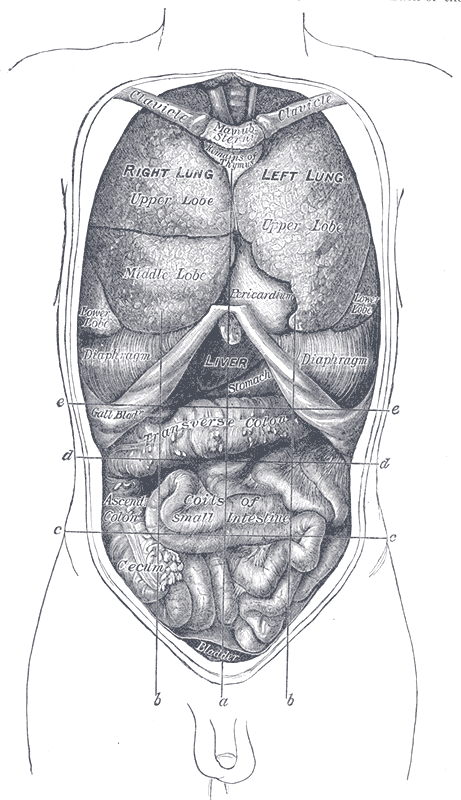
- Front view of the thoracic and abdominal viscera. a. Median plane. b. Lateral planes. c. Trans tubercular plane. d. Subcostal plane. e. Transpyloric plane.

Details

Identifiers
- Latin: planum subcostale
- TA98: A01.2.00.008
- TA2: 54
- FMA: 14610

The subcostal plane is a transverse plane which bisects the body at the level of the 10th costal margin and the lower border of the third lumbar vertebra.

== See also ==
- Interspinous plane
- Inferior mesenteric artery
- Quadrants and regions of abdomen
- Supracristal plane
- Transpyloric plane
- Transtubercular plane
- Transumbilical plane
