= Transpyloric plane =

Anatomical plane

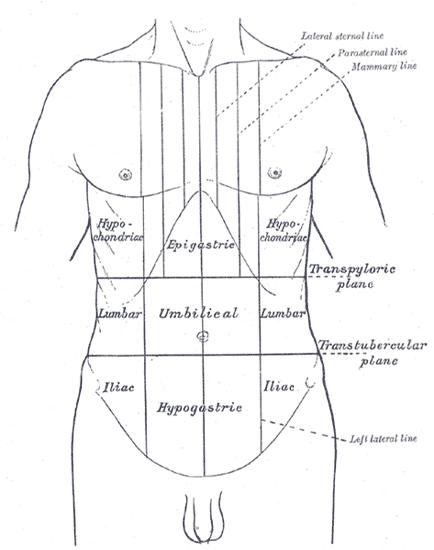
- Surface lines of the front of the thorax and abdomen. (Transpyloric is top horizontal line.)

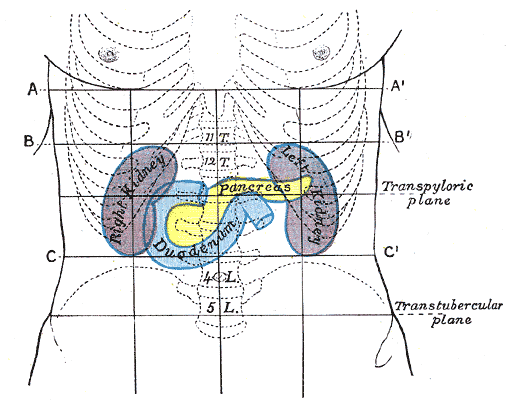
- Front of abdomen, showing surface markings for duodenum, pancreas, and kidneys.

Details

Identifiers
- Latin: planum transpyloricum
- TA98: A01.2.00.007
- TA2: 53
- FMA: 14608

The transpyloric plane, also known as Addison's plane, is an imaginary horizontal plane, located halfway between the suprasternal notch of the manubrium and the upper border of the symphysis pubis at the level of the first lumbar vertebra, L1. It lies roughly a hand's breadth beneath the xiphisternum or midway between the xiphisternum and the umbilicus. The plane in most cases cuts through the pylorus of the stomach, the tips of the ninth costal cartilages and the lower border of the first lumbar vertebra.

== Structures crossed ==
The transpyloric plane is clinically notable because it passes through several important abdominal structures. It also divides the supracolic and infracolic compartments, with the liver, spleen and gastric fundus above it and the small intestine and colon below it.

=== Lumbar vertebra and spinal cord ===
The lower border of first lumbar vertebra lies at the level of the transpyloric plane, according to Gray's Anatomy. Despite the conus medullaris, the end of the spinal cord, being understood to typically terminate at the level of the transpyloric plane, there is significant variability. Conversely, in the young child the cord is relatively longer and ends at the upper border of the third lumbar vertebra (subcostal plane). Due to biological variation, some adult people have spinal cords ending either above or below the transpyloric plane.

=== Stomach ===
The transpyloric plane passes through the pylorus of the stomach, despite it being suspended by the lesser and greater omentum and being relatively mobile.

=== Duodenum ===
The horizontal part of the duodenum slopes upwards to the left of the vertical midline, following which the vertical ascending part of the duodenum reaches the transpyloric plane. It ends in the duodenojejunal junction, which lies approximately 2.5 cm to the left of the midline and just below the transpyloric plane.

=== Pancreas ===
The neck of pancreas lies on the transpyloric plane, whilst the body and tail are to the left and above it.

=== Gallbladder ===
The fundus of the gallbladder projects from the liver's inferior border at the intersection of the transpyloric plane and the right lateral midline.

=== Kidneys ===
Despite the right kidney lying 1 cm lower than the left (right just below and the left just above the plane), to be practical, the surface markings are taken the same way. The hilum of the kidney on the left and right is taken as 5 cm from the vertical midline and is on the transpyloric plane.

=== Vasculature ===
The superior mesenteric artery arises from the aorta at the level of the transpyloric plane and emerges between the head and neck of the pancreas.

The superior mesenteric vein is joined by the splenic vein to form the portal vein at the level of the transpyloric plane.

=== Spleen ===
The lower border of the spleen lies near the transpyloric plane.

=== Other structures ===
- the left and right colic flexure
- the root of the transverse mesocolon.
- cisterna chyli (which drains into the thoracic duct).

== History ==
The transpyloric plane relates to the three-dimensional mapping of the abdomen founded on more than 10,000 measurements completed on 40 bodies, that surgeon Viscount Addison took at the turn of the 20th century.

Addison reported his findings in a paper titled, "On the anatomical topography of the abdominal viscera in man, especially the gastro-intestinal canal" in which he established a baseline for the anatomy of the abdomen based on the arrangement of the map of the Earth. Using the suprasternal notch as the North Pole of the trunk, and the upper border of the pubic symphysis as the South Pole, he drew a vertical line joining these two points as his meridian. At the meridian's midpoint, he then drew a perpendicular line corresponding to the Equator. As this transverse plane crossed the pylorus, he called it the transpyloric plane.

== Images ==
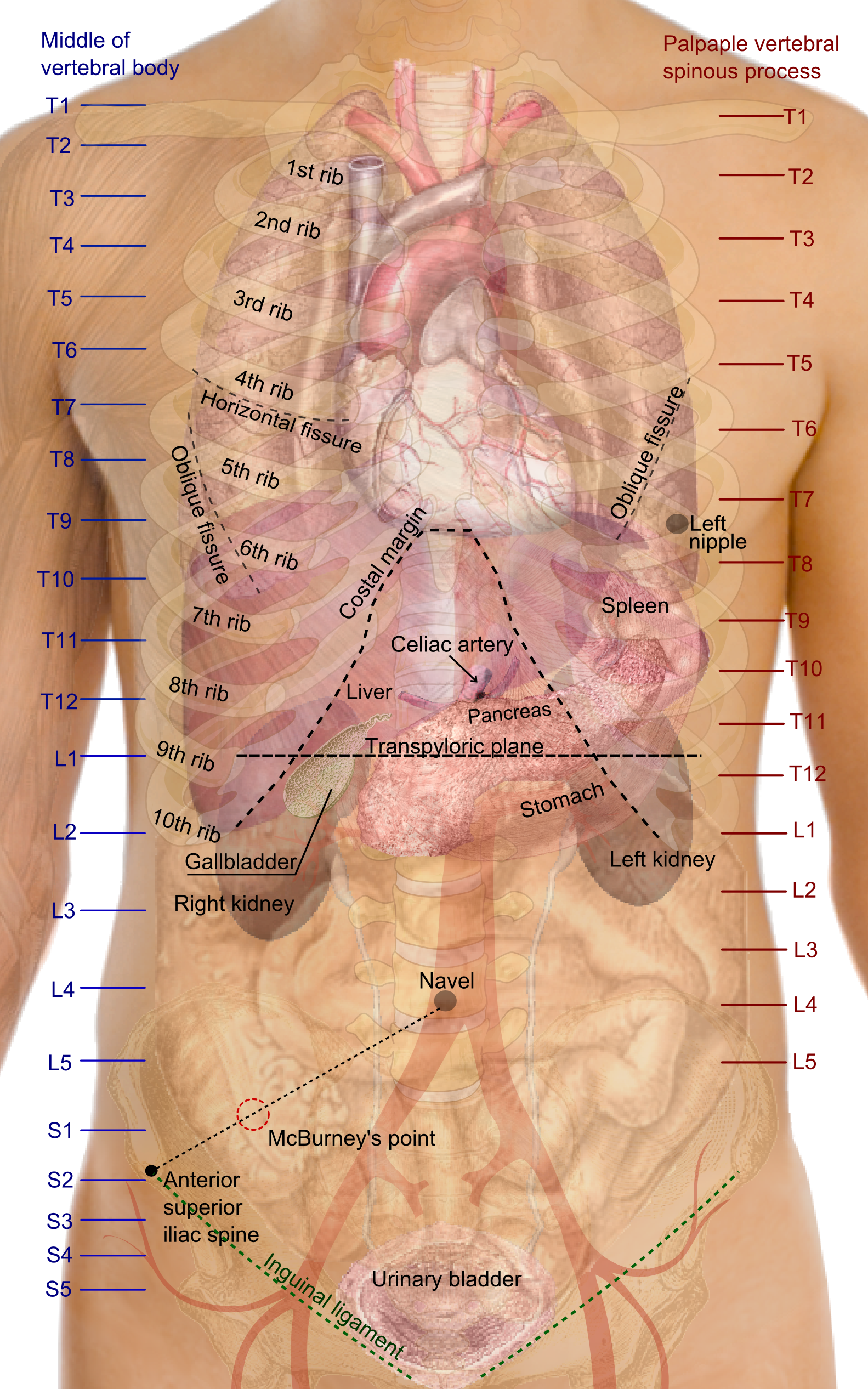
Surface projections of the organs of the trunk, with transpyloric plane labeled at L1

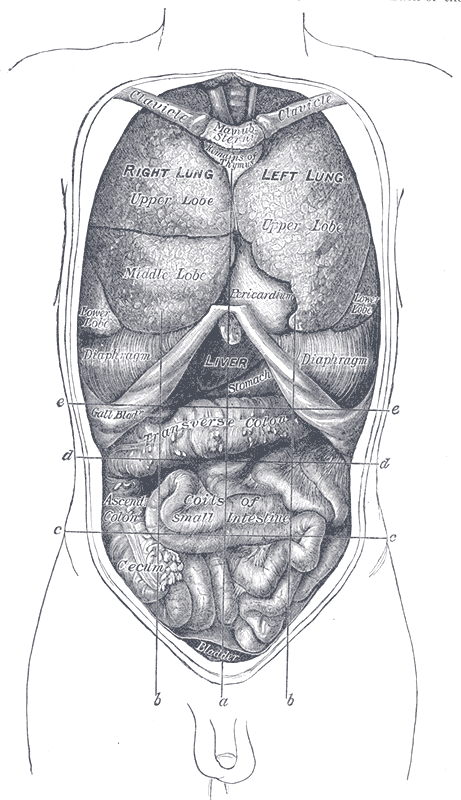
Front view of the thoracic and abdominal viscera.
a. Median plane.
b. Lateral planes.
c. Trans tubercular plane.
d. Subcostal plane.
e. Transpyloric plane.

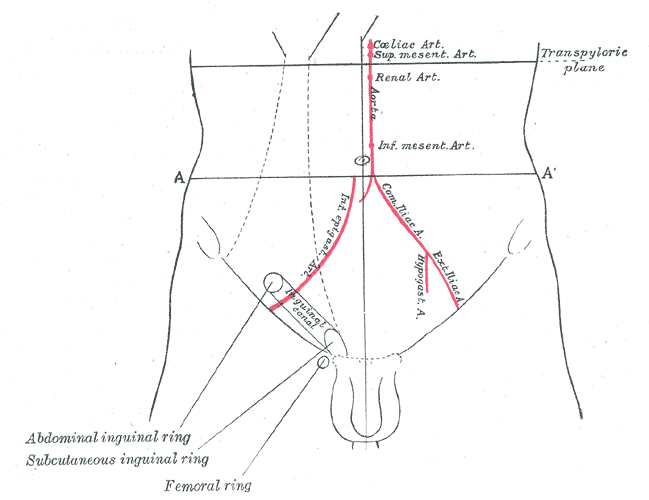
Front of abdomen, showing surface markings for arteries and inguinal canal.

== See also ==
- Interspinous plane
- Quadrants and regions of abdomen
- Subcostal plane
- Superior mesenteric artery
- Supracristal plane
- Transtubercular plane
- Transumbilical plane
