= Quadrants and regions of abdomen =

Anatomical subdivision scheme

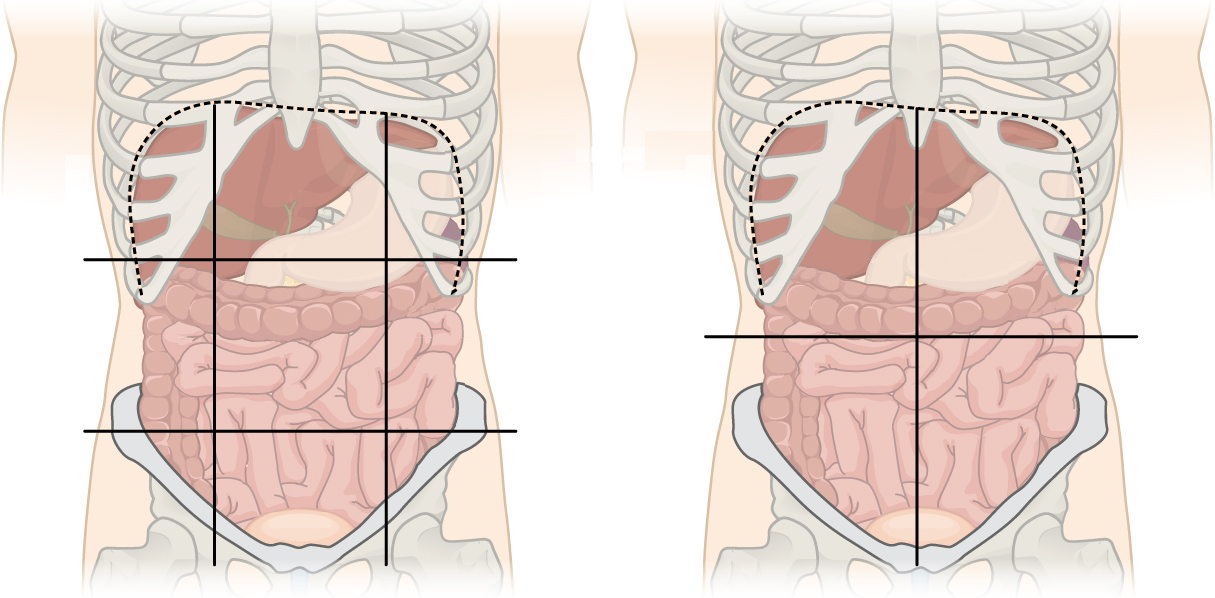
- Side-by-side comparison of the regions (left) and quadrants (right) of the abdomen

The human abdomen is divided into quadrants and regions by anatomists and physicians for the purposes of study, diagnosis, and treatment. The division into four quadrants allows the localisation of pain and tenderness, scars, lumps, and other items of interest, narrowing in on which organs and tissues may be involved. The quadrants are referred to as the left lower quadrant, left upper quadrant, right upper quadrant and right lower quadrant. These terms are not used in comparative anatomy, since most other animals do not stand erect.

The left lower quadrant includes the left iliac fossa and half of the flank. The equivalent in other animals is left posterior quadrant. The left upper quadrant extends from the umbilical plane to the left ribcage. This is the left anterior quadrant in other animals. The right upper quadrant extends from umbilical plane to the right ribcage. The equivalent in other animals is right anterior quadrant. The right lower quadrant extends from the umbilical plane to the right inguinal ligament. This in other animals is the right posterior quadrant.

The nine regions offer more detailed anatomy and are delineated by two vertical and two horizontal lines.

== Quadrants ==
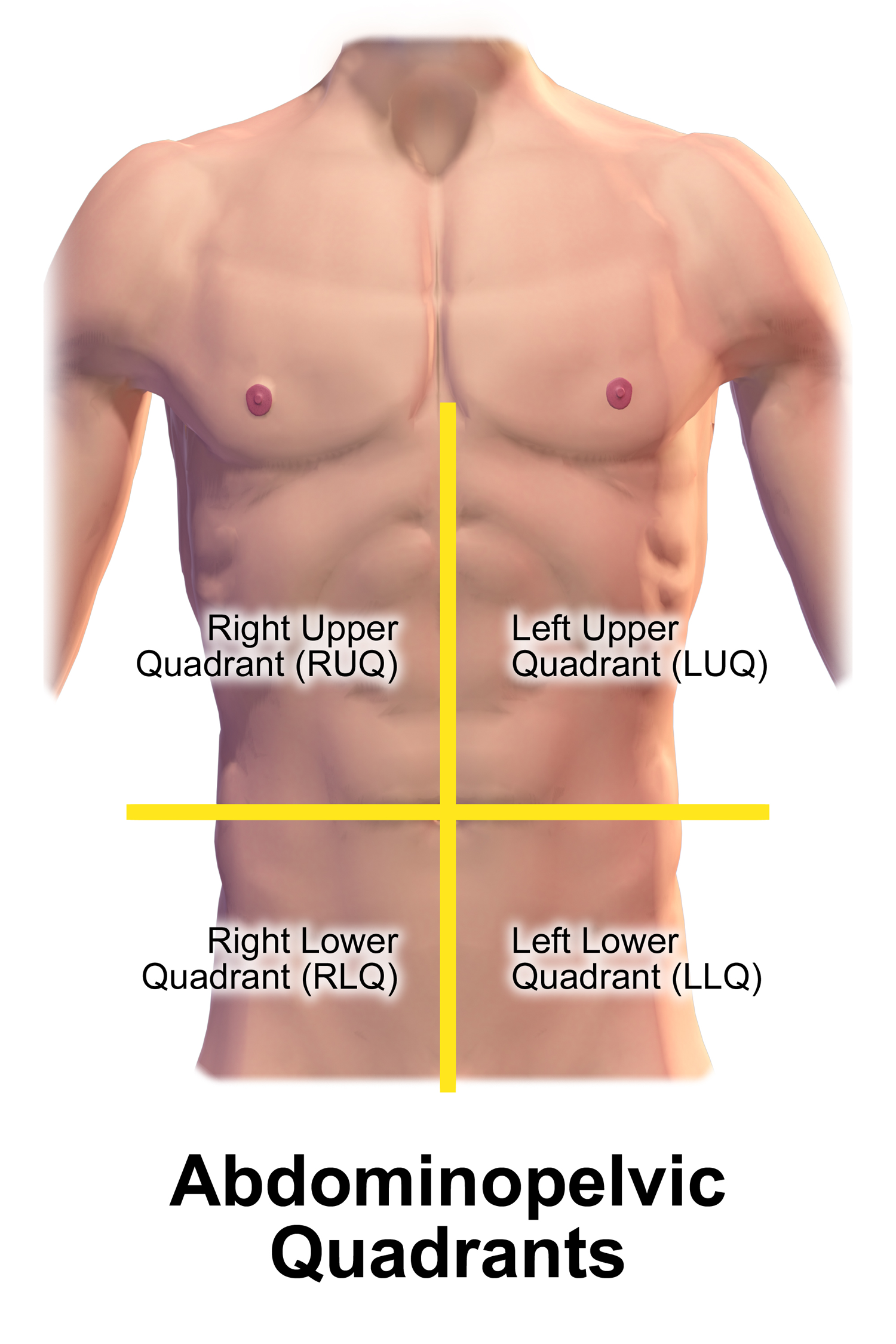
Quadrants of the abdomen

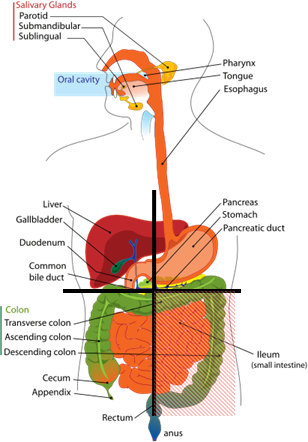
Diagram showing which organs (or parts of organs) are in each quadrant of the abdomen

The left lower quadrant (LLQ) of the human abdomen is the area left of the midline and below the umbilicus. The LLQ includes the left iliac fossa and half of the left flank region. The equivalent term for animals is left posterior quadrant. Important organs here are:

- the descending colon and sigmoid colon
- the left ovary and fallopian tube
- the left ureter

The left upper quadrant (LUQ) extends from the median plane to the left of the patient, and from the umbilical plane to the left ribcage. The equivalent term for animals is left anterior quadrant. Important organs here are:

- Stomach
- Spleen
- Left lobe of liver
- Body of pancreas
- Left kidney and adrenal gland
- Splenic flexure of colon
- Parts of transverse and descending colon

The right upper quadrant (RUQ) extends from the median plane to the right of the patient, and from the umbilical plane to the right ribcage. The equivalent term for animals is right anterior quadrant. Important organs here are:

- Liver
- Gall bladder with biliary tree
- Duodenum
- Head of pancreas
- Right kidney and adrenal gland
- Hepatic flexure of colon

The right lower quadrant (RLQ) extends from the median plane to the right of the patient, and from the umbilical plane to the right inguinal ligament. The equivalent term for animals is right posterior quadrant. Important organs here are:

- Cecum
- Appendix
- Ascending colon
- Right ovary and fallopian tube
- Right ureter

== Regions ==
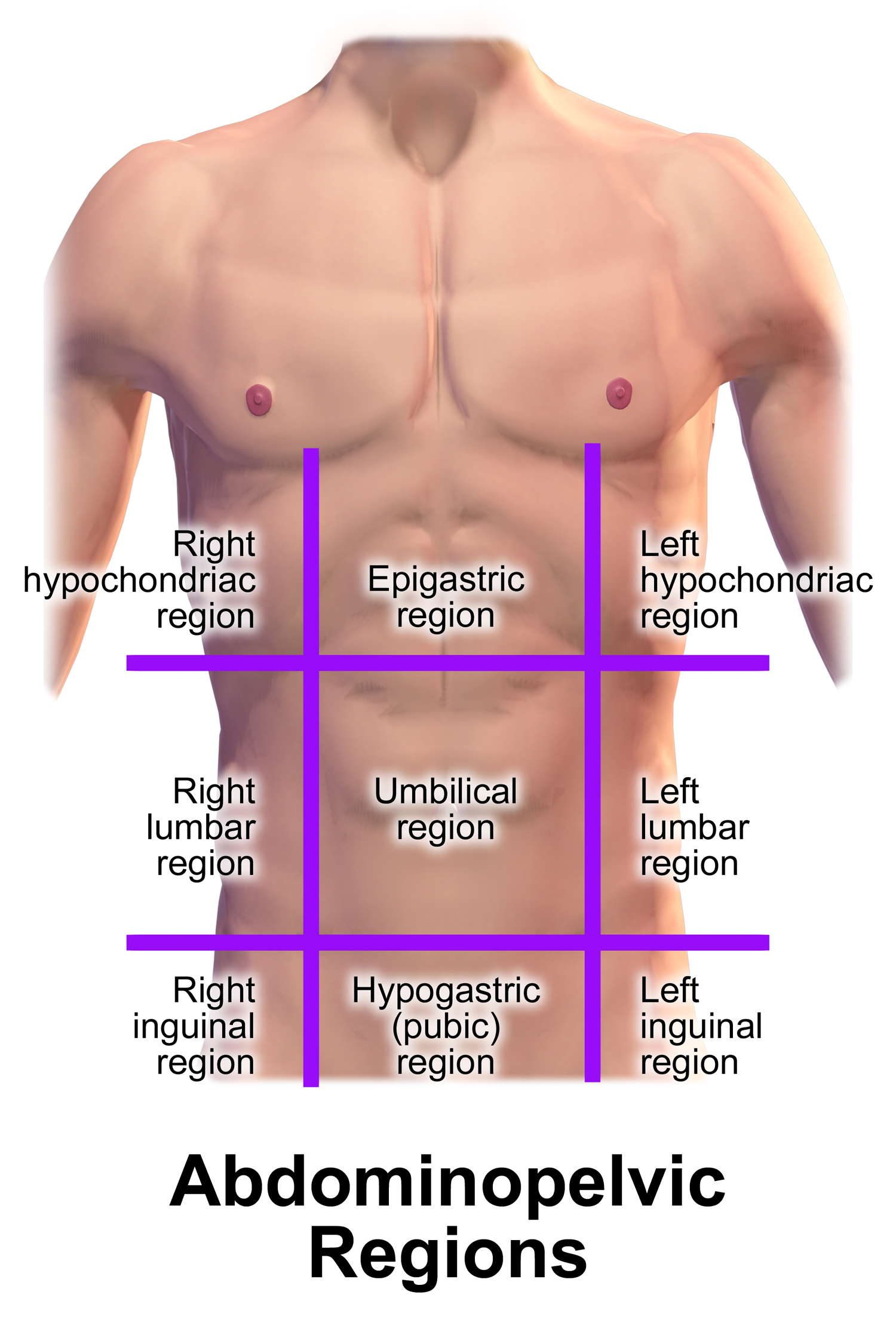
Regions of abdomen

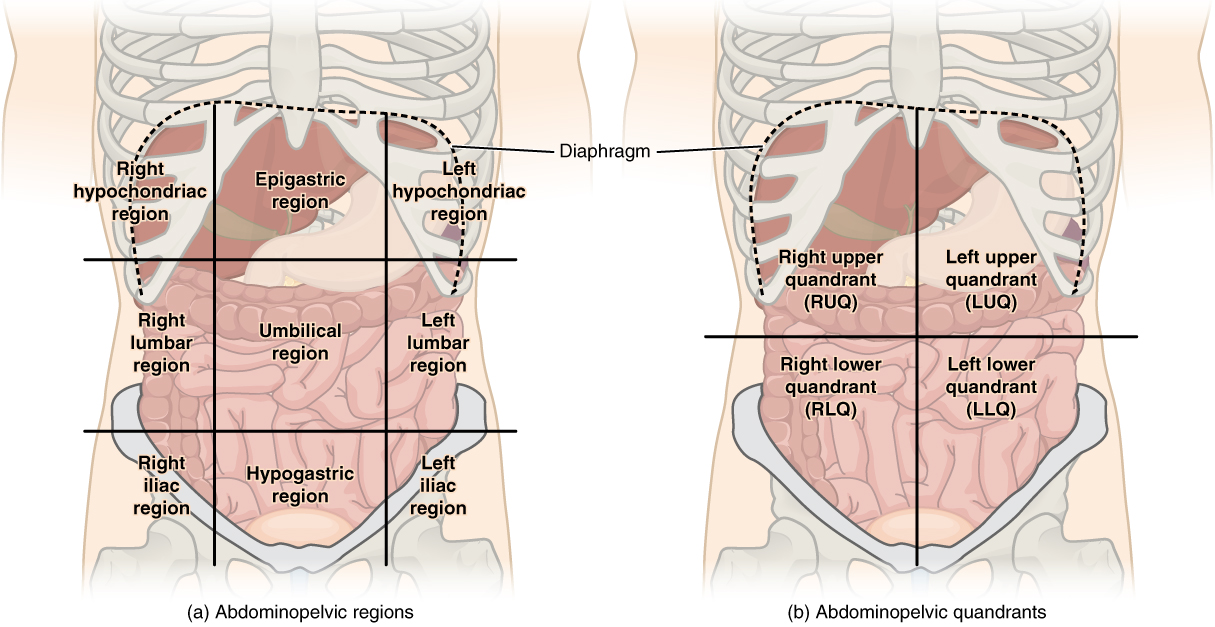
Regions shown on left in side-by-side comparison with quadrants

Nine regions of the abdomen can be marked using two horizontal and two vertical dividing lines. The vertical lines are the mid-clavicular lines taken from the mid-point of each clavicle. The upper horizontal line is the subcostal line taken from the inferior parts of the lowest costal cartilages. The lower horizontal line is the transtubercular line connecting the tubercles of the pelvis.

The three main centrally positioned regions are the epigastric region, the umbilical region, and the hypogastric region also known as the pubic region.

On the sides of the abdomen the other six regions are the left and right hypochondriac regions, on either side of the epigastrium; the left and right lumbar flank regions, on either side of the umbilical region, and the left and right iliac or inguinal regions on either side of the hypogastrium.

("Hypo-" means below; "epi-" means above; "chondron" means cartilage (in this case, the cartilage of the rib) and "gaster" means stomach. The reversal of "left" and "right" is intentional, because the anatomical designations reflect the patient's own right and left.)

== Clinical significance ==
If abdominal pain or signs of peritonitis are localised in the LLQ, colitis, diverticulitis, ureteral colic or pain due to ovarian cysts or pelvic inflammatory disease may be suspected. Examples of tumors in the left lower quadrant include colon cancer and ovarian tumor.

The LUQ may be painful or tender in the case of intestinal malrotation. The RUQ may be painful or tender in hepatitis, cholecystitis, and peptic ulcer. The RLQ, in particular the right inguinal region or right iliac fossa may be painful and tender in conditions such as appendicitis.

=== Differential diagnosis ===
Children

- gastroenteritis, mesenteric adenitis, Meckel's diverticulitis, intussusception, Henoch–Schönlein purpura, lobar pneumonia

Adults

- regional enteritis, renal colic, perforated peptic ulcer, testicular torsion, rectus sheath hematoma, pelvic inflammatory disease, ectopic pregnancy, endometriosis, torsion/rupture of ovarian cyst, appendicitis

Elderly

- diverticulitis, intestinal obstruction, colonic carcinoma, mesenteric ischemia, leaking aortic aneurysm

== See also ==
- Murphy's sign
- McBurney's point
- Superficial anatomy
