= Iliac tubercle =

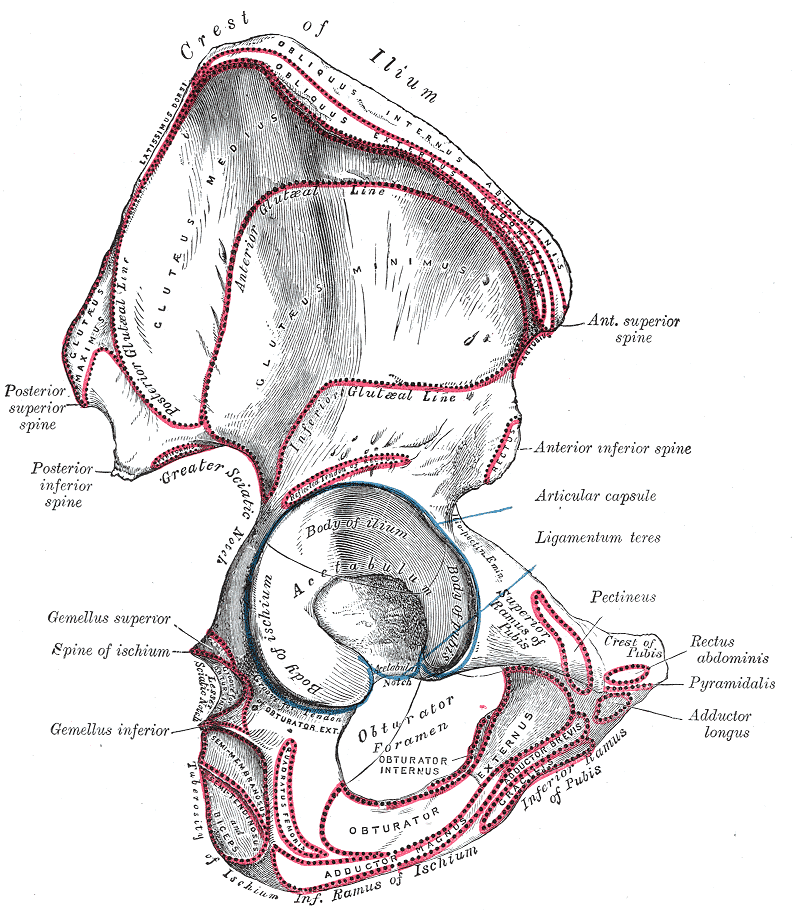
- Right hip bone. External surface.

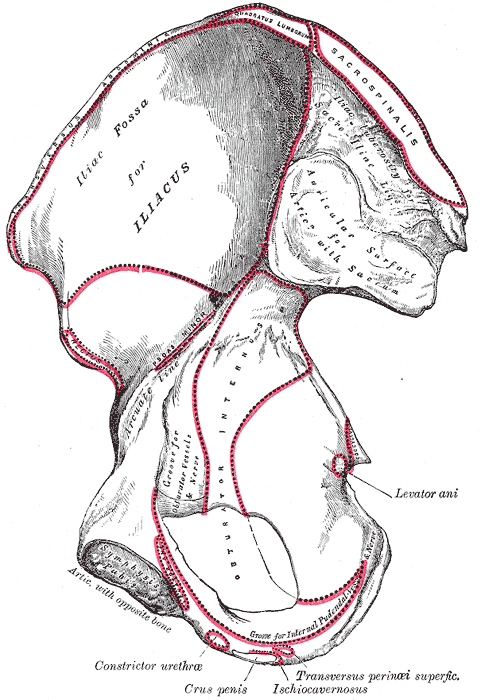
- Right hip bone. Internal surface.

Details

Identifiers
- Latin: tuberculum iliacum
- TA98: A02.5.01.108
- TA2: 1324
- FMA: 16900

The iliac tubercle is located approximately 5 cm (2 in) posterior to the anterior superior iliac spine on the iliac crest in humans. The transverse plane that includes each of the tubercles (one from the left iliac tubercle and one from the right iliac tubercle) is called the transtubercular plane. The origin of the iliotibial tract is the iliac tubercle. The iliac tubercle is also the widest point of the iliac crest, and lies at the level of the L5 spinous process.
