= Tendinous intersection =

Three fibrous bands crossing the rectus abdominis muscle

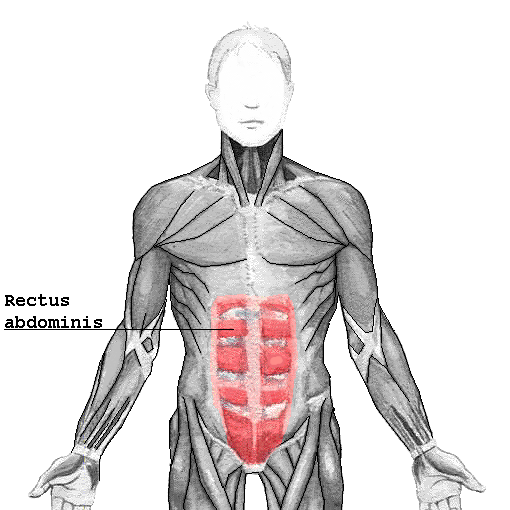
- Rectus abdominis

Details

Identifiers
- Latin: intersectiones tendineae musculi recti abdominis
- TA98: A04.0.00.046

The rectus abdominis muscle is crossed by three fibrous bands called the tendinous intersections or tendinous inscriptions. One is usually situated at the level of the umbilicus, one at the extremity of the xiphoid process, and the third about midway between the two.

These intersections pass transversely or obliquely across the muscle; they rarely extend completely through its substance and may pass only halfway across it; they are intimately adherent in front to the sheath of the muscle.

Sometimes one or two additional intersections, generally incomplete, are present below the umbilicus.

== Colloquial reference ==
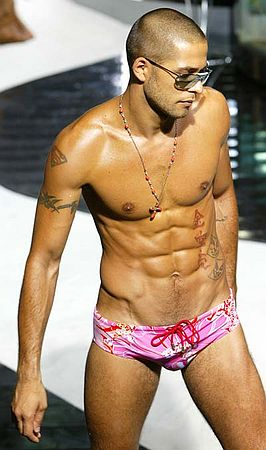

If well-defined, the rectus abdominis is informally called a "six-pack". This is due to tendinous intersections within the muscle, usually at the level of the umbilicus (belly-button), the xiphisternum, and about halfway between.

An extremely well defined abdominal section can appear to be an "eight pack", as all eight sections of the abdominal muscle become defined. This definition is prominent among athletes with low percentages of body fat, such as bodybuilders, boxers, mixed martial artists, rock climbers, and track and field athletes.

== Physiological function ==
The tendinous intersections, in conjunction with the rectus abdominis, function to provide varying degrees of forward flexion to the lumbar region of the vertebral column, producing forward bending at the waist. Forward flexion results in a decreased angle between the trunk and lower body.

The anatomical segmentation of the rectus abdominis into three pairs of muscles and the positioning of these three pairs of muscles at different levels along the lumbar region (which are created by the tendinous intersections) are responsible for the forward flexion of the vertebral column:

1. As the superior (or proximal) pair of rectus abdominis muscles contract, the vertebral column is able to slightly flex forward.
2. If more forward flexion is needed, the middle pair of rectus abdominis muscles can contract along with the distal pair to allow the vertebral column to flex forward even further.
3. Lastly, as the inferior (or distal) pair of muscles contract in conjunction with the other two muscle groups, the vertebral column is able to produce the most forward flexion and the smallest angle between the trunk and lower body.

The tendinous intersections define the anatomy of the rectus abdominis and assist with physiological movement. If the rectus abdominis did not have tendinous intersections, there would be one large muscle group on each side of the linea alba. This large muscle group would allow the vertebral column to flex forward, but would not permit a large extent of forward flexion.

The forward flexion provided by tendinous intersections makes daily activities like stretching or bending over to pick up an object possible.

== Additional images ==
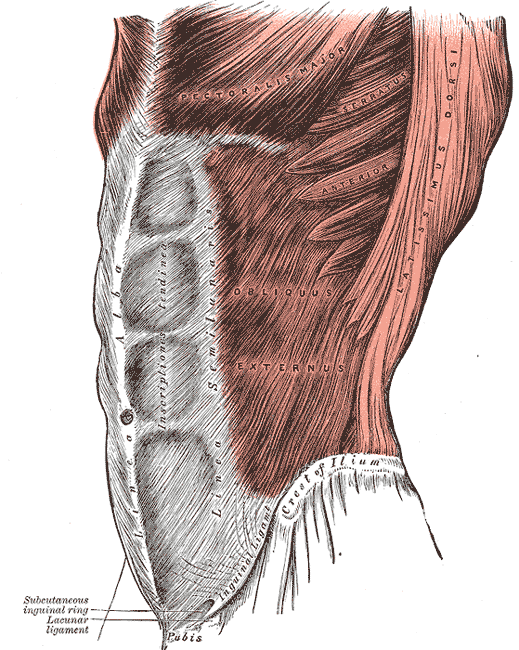
The Obliquus externus abdominis.
