= Abdomen =

Part of the body between the chest and pelvis

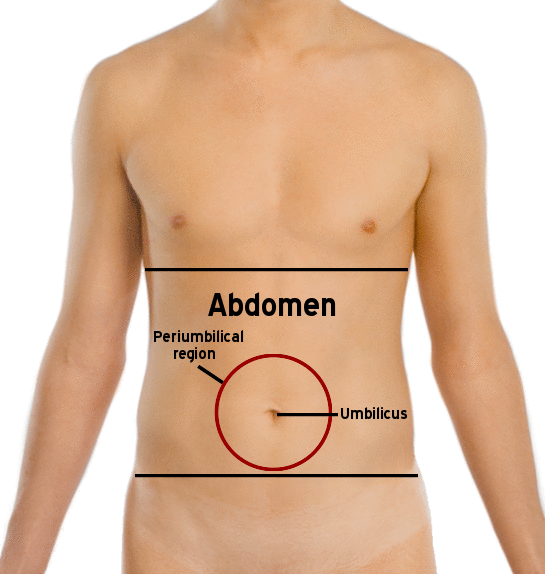

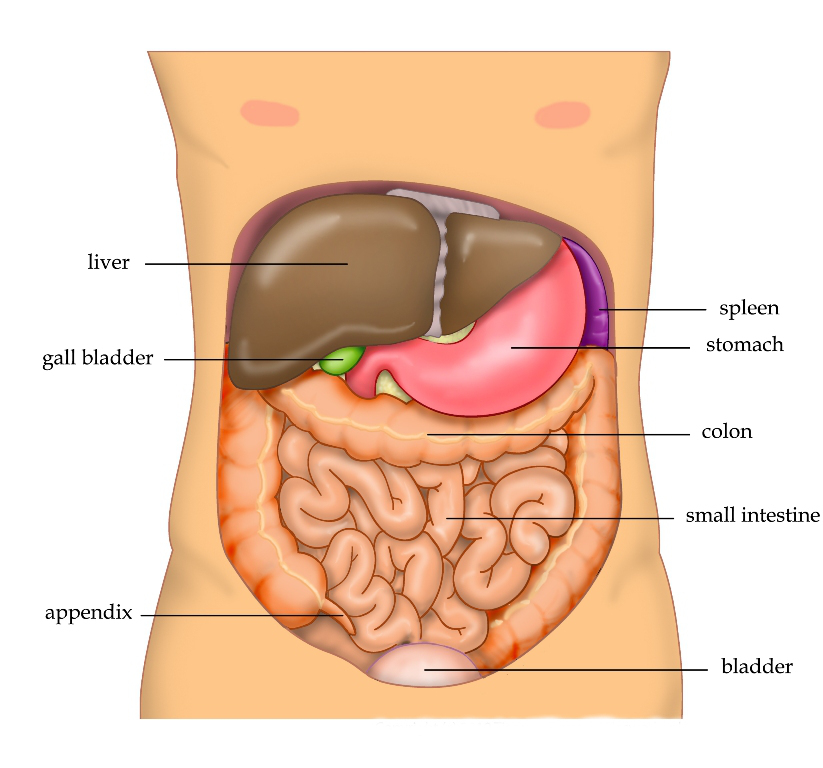
- The human male abdomen and organs which can be found beneath the surface

Details
- Actions: Movement and support for the torso Assistance with breathing Protection for the inner organs Postural support

Identifiers
- Latin: abdomen
- Greek: ἦτρον
- MeSH: D000005
- TA98: A01.1.00.016
- TA2: 127
- FMA: 9577

An abdomen (also belly or stomach in vertebrates, or metasoma in arthropods) is the front part of the torso between the thorax (chest) and pelvis in humans and in other vertebrates. The area occupied by the abdomen is called the abdominal cavity. In arthropods, it is the posterior tagma of the body; it follows the thorax or cephalothorax.

In humans, the abdomen stretches from the thorax at the thoracic diaphragm to the pelvis at the pelvic brim. The pelvic brim stretches from the lumbosacral joint (the intervertebral disc between L5 and S1) to the pubic symphysis and is the edge of the pelvic inlet. The space above this inlet and under the thoracic diaphragm is termed the abdominal cavity. The boundary of the abdominal cavity is the abdominal wall in the front and the peritoneal surface at the rear.

In vertebrates, the abdomen is a large body cavity enclosed by the abdominal muscles, at the front and to the sides, and by part of the vertebral column at the back. Lower ribs can also enclose ventral and lateral walls. The abdominal cavity is continuous with, and above, the pelvic cavity. It is attached to the thoracic cavity by the diaphragm. Structures such as the aorta, inferior vena cava and esophagus pass through the diaphragm. Both the abdominal and pelvic cavities are lined by a serous membrane known as the parietal peritoneum. This membrane is continuous with the visceral peritoneum lining the organs. The abdomen in vertebrates contains a number of organs belonging to, for instance, the digestive system, urinary system, and muscular system.

== Contents ==
The abdominal cavity contains most organs of the digestive system, including the stomach, the small intestine, and the colon with its attached appendix. Other digestive organs are known as the accessory digestive organs and include the liver, its attached gallbladder, and the pancreas, and these communicate with the rest of the system via various ducts. The spleen, and organs of the urinary system including the kidneys, and adrenal glands also lie within the abdomen, along with many blood vessels including the aorta and inferior vena cava. The urinary bladder, uterus, fallopian tubes, and ovaries may be seen as either abdominal organs or as pelvic organs. Finally, the abdomen contains an extensive membrane called the peritoneum. A fold of peritoneum may completely cover certain organs, whereas it may cover only one side of organs that usually lie closer to the abdominal wall. This is called the retroperitoneum, and the kidneys and ureters are known as retroperitoneal organs.

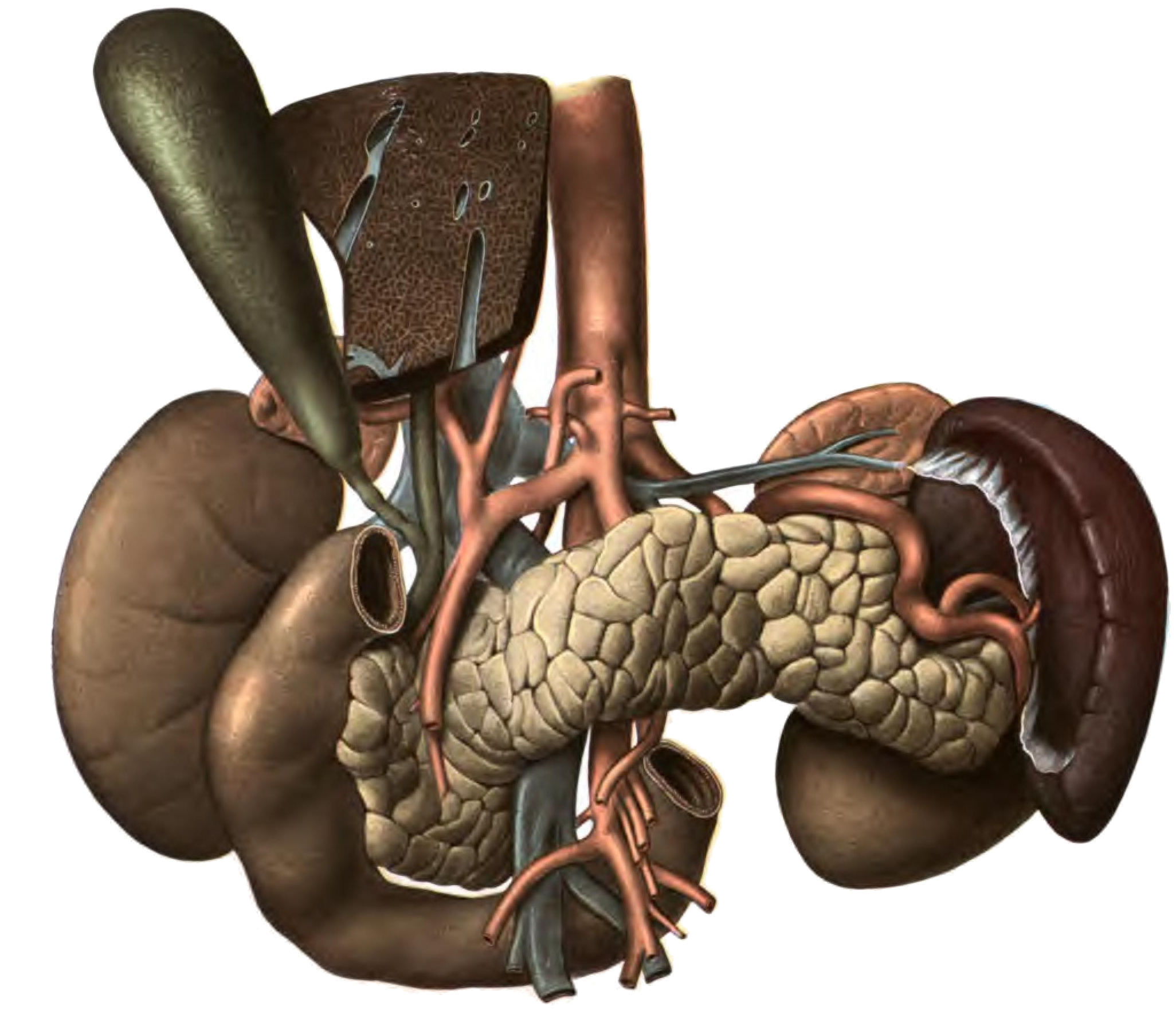
View of the various organs and blood-vessels in proximity with liver

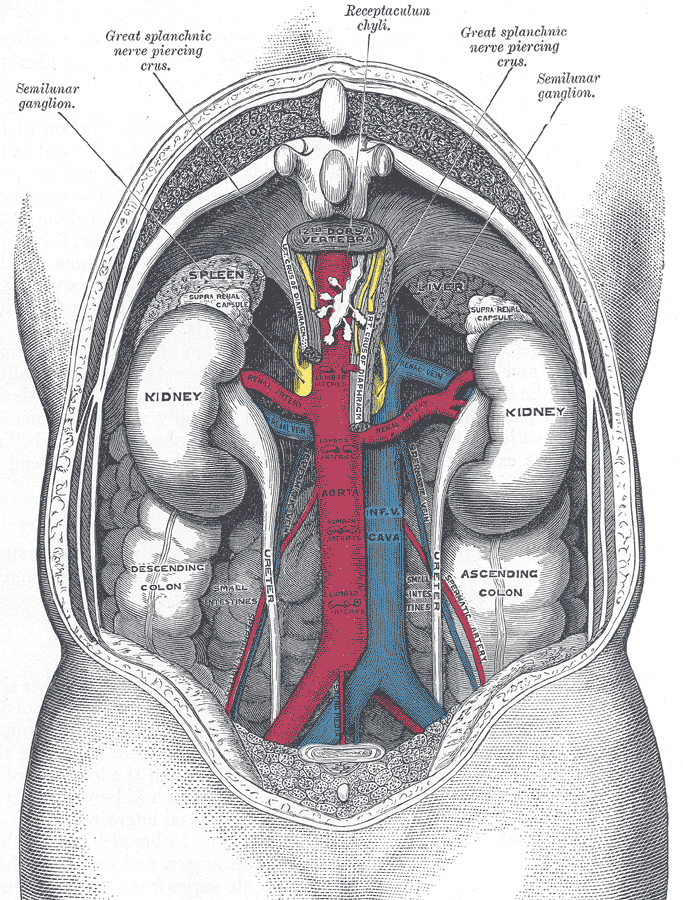
The relations of the viscera and large vessels of the abdomen, seen from behind

== Muscles ==
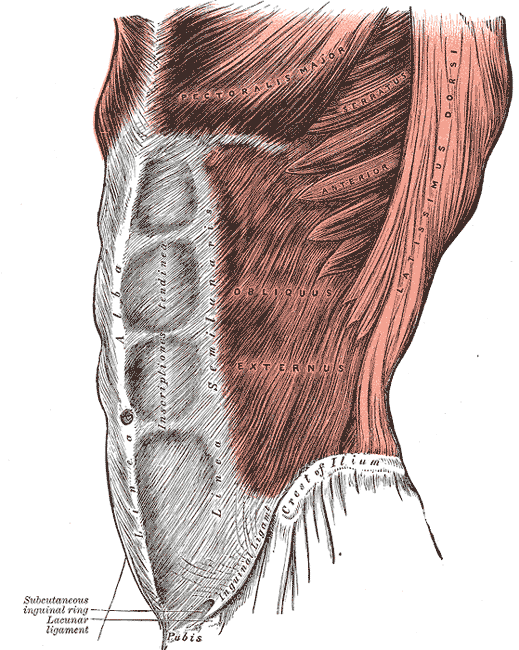
Henry Gray (1825–1861). Anatomy of the Human Body

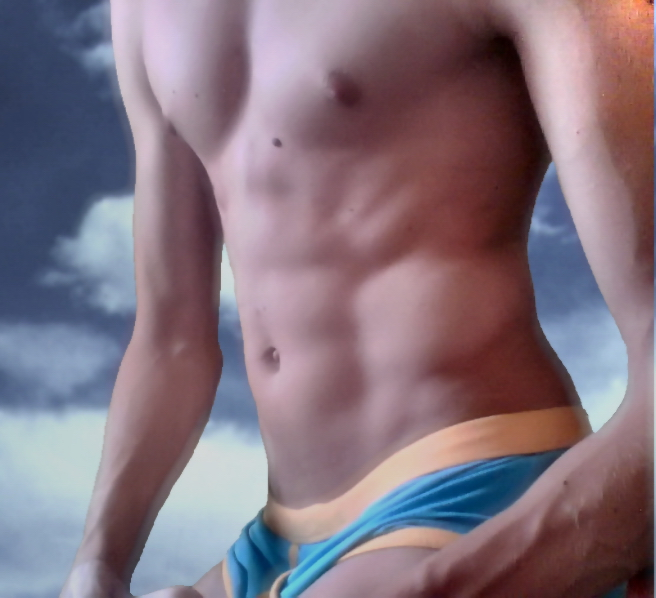
A male abdomen

There are three layers of muscles in the abdominal wall. They are, from the outside to the inside: external oblique, internal oblique, and transverse abdominal. The first three layers extend between the vertebral column, the lower ribs, the iliac crest and pubis of the hip. All of their fibers merge towards the midline and surround the rectus abdominis in a sheath before joining up on the opposite side at the linea alba. Strength is gained by the criss-crossing of fibers, such that the external oblique runs downward and forward, the internal oblique upward and forward, and the transverse abdominal horizontally forward.

The transverse abdominal muscle is flat and triangular, with its fibers running horizontally. It lies between the internal oblique and the underlying transverse fascia. It originates from the inguinal ligament, costal cartilages 7–12, the iliac crest and thoracolumbar fascia. Inserts into the conjoint tendon, xiphoid process, linea alba and the pubic crest.

The rectus abdominis muscles are long and flat. The muscle is crossed by three fibrous bands called the tendinous intersections. The rectus abdominis is enclosed in a thick sheath, formed as described above, by fibers from each of the three muscles of the lateral abdominal wall. They originate at the pubis bone, run up the abdomen on either side of the linea alba, and insert into the cartilages of the fifth, sixth, and seventh ribs. In the region of the groin, the inguinal canal, is a passage through the layers. This gap is where the testes can drop through the wall and where the fibrous cord from the uterus in the female runs. This is also where weakness can form, and cause inguinal hernias.

The pyramidalis muscle is small and triangular. It is located in the lower abdomen in front of the rectus abdominis. It originates at the pubic bone and is inserted into the linea alba halfway up to the navel.

== Function ==
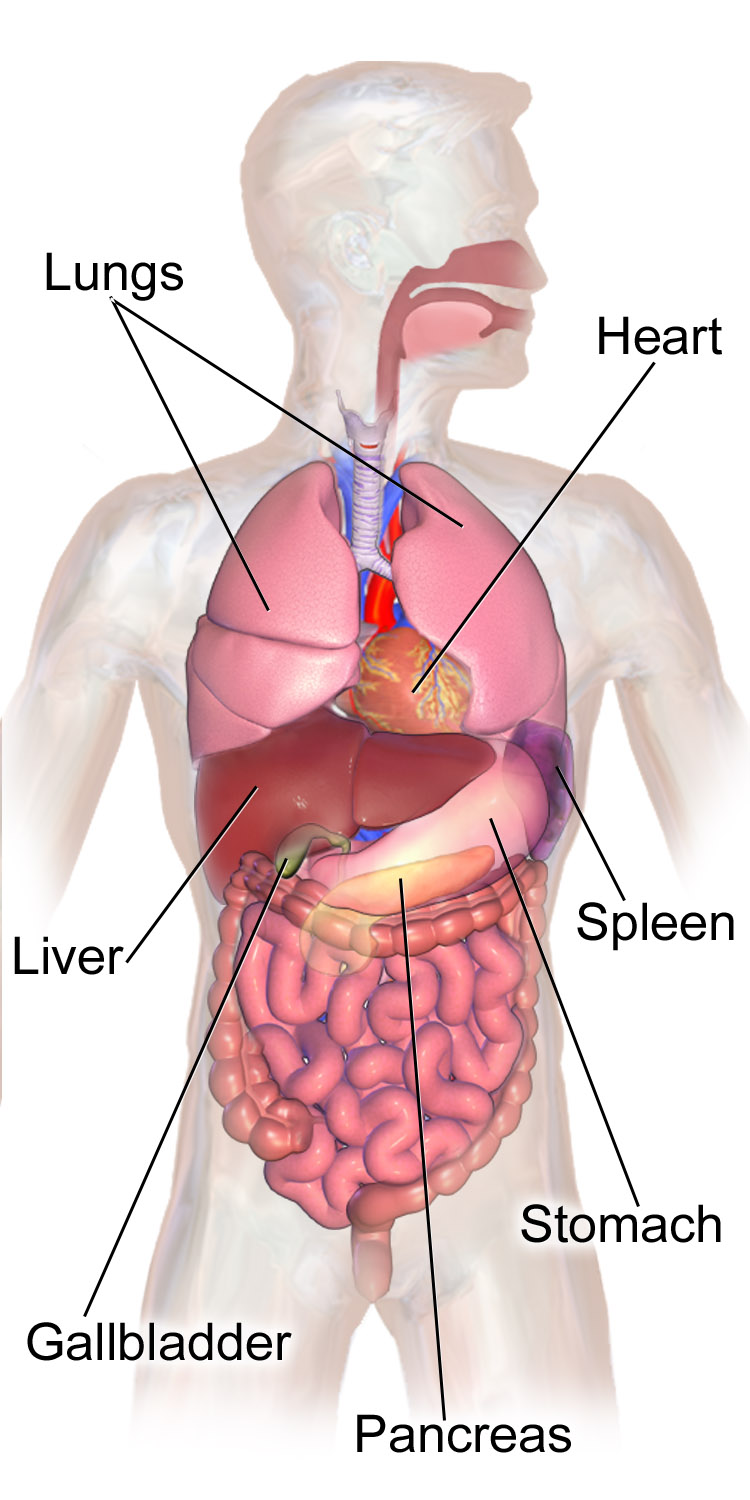
Abdominal organs anatomy in an adult human male

Functionally, the human abdomen is where most of the digestive tract is placed and so most of the absorption and digestion of food occurs here. The alimentary tract in the abdomen consists of the lower esophagus, the stomach, the duodenum, the jejunum, ileum, the cecum and the appendix, the ascending, transverse and descending colons, the sigmoid colon and the rectum. Other vital organs inside the abdomen include the liver, the kidneys, the pancreas and the spleen.

The abdominal wall is split into the posterior (back), lateral (sides), and anterior (front) walls.

=== Movement, breathing and other functions ===
The abdominal muscles have different important functions. They assist as muscles of exhalation in the breathing process during forceful exhalation. Moreover, these muscles serve as protection for the inner organs. Furthermore, together with the back muscles they provide postural support and are important in defining the form. When the glottis is closed and the thorax and pelvis are fixed, they are integral in the cough, urination, defecation, childbirth, vomit, and singing functions. When the pelvis is fixed, they can initiate the movement of the trunk in a forward motion. They also prevent hyperextension. When the thorax is fixed, they can pull up the pelvis and finally, they can bend the vertebral column sideways and assist in the trunk's rotation.

=== Posture ===
The transverse abdominis muscle is the deepest muscle; therefore, it cannot be touched from the outside. It can greatly affect the body's posture. The internal obliques are also deep and also affect body posture. Both of them are involved in rotation and lateral flexion of the spine and are used to bend and support the spine from the front. The external obliques are more superficial and are also involved in rotation and lateral flexion of the spine. They also stabilize the spine when upright. The rectus abdominis muscle is not the most superficial abdominal muscle. The tendonous sheath extending from the external obliques cover the rectus abdominis. The rectus abdominis is the muscle that very fit people develop into "six-pack" abs, though there are five vertical sections on each side. The two bottom sections are just above the pubic bone and usually not visible. The rectus abdominis function is to bend one's back forward (flexion). The main work of the abdominal muscles is to bend the spine forward when contracting concentrically.

== Society and culture ==
Social and cultural perceptions of the outward appearance of the abdomen has varying significance around the world. Depending on the type of society, excess weight can be perceived as an indicator of wealth and prestige due to excess food, or as a sign of poor health due to lack of exercise. In many cultures, bare abdomens are distinctly sexualized and perceived similarly to breast cleavage.

== Exercise ==
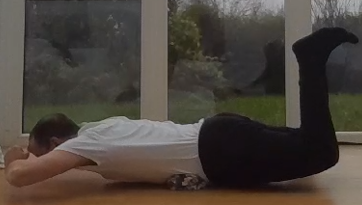
The Superman exercise, involving balancing solely with the abdomen (on a folded towel) while raising the upper torso and pelvis off the floor with the limbs bent. There are numerous variations.

Being key elements of spinal support, and contributors to good posture, it is important to properly exercise the abdominal muscles together with the back muscles because when these are weak or overly tight they can suffer painful spasms and injuries. When properly exercised, abdominal muscles contribute to improved posture and balance, reduce the likelihood of back pain episodes, reduce the severity of back pain, protect against injury, help avoid some back surgeries, and help with the healing of back problems, or after spine surgery. When strengthened, the abdominal muscles provide flexibility as well. The abdominal muscles can be worked by strength and fitness exercises, and through practicing disciplines of general body strength such as Pilates, yoga, tai chi, and jogging.

== Clinical significance ==
Abdominal obesity is a condition where abdominal fat or visceral fat, has built up excessively between the abdominal organs. This is associated with a higher risk of heart disease, asthma and type 2 diabetes.

Abdominal trauma is an injury to the abdomen and can involve damage to the abdominal organs. There is an associated risk of severe blood loss and infection. Injury to the lower chest can cause injuries to the spleen and liver.

A scaphoid abdomen is when the abdomen is sucked inwards. In a newborn, it may represent a diaphragmatic hernia. In general, it is indicative of malnutrition.

=== Disease ===
Many gastrointestinal diseases affect the abdominal organs. These include stomach disease, liver disease, pancreatic disease, gallbladder and bile duct disease; intestinal diseases include enteritis, coeliac disease, diverticulitis, and irritable bowel syndrome.

=== Examination ===
Different medical procedures can be used to examine the organs of the gastrointestinal tract. These include endoscopy, colonoscopy, sigmoidoscopy, enteroscopy, oesophagogastroduodenoscopy and virtual colonoscopy. There are also a number of medical imaging techniques that can be used. Surface landmarks are important in the examination of the abdomen.

==== Surface landmarks ====
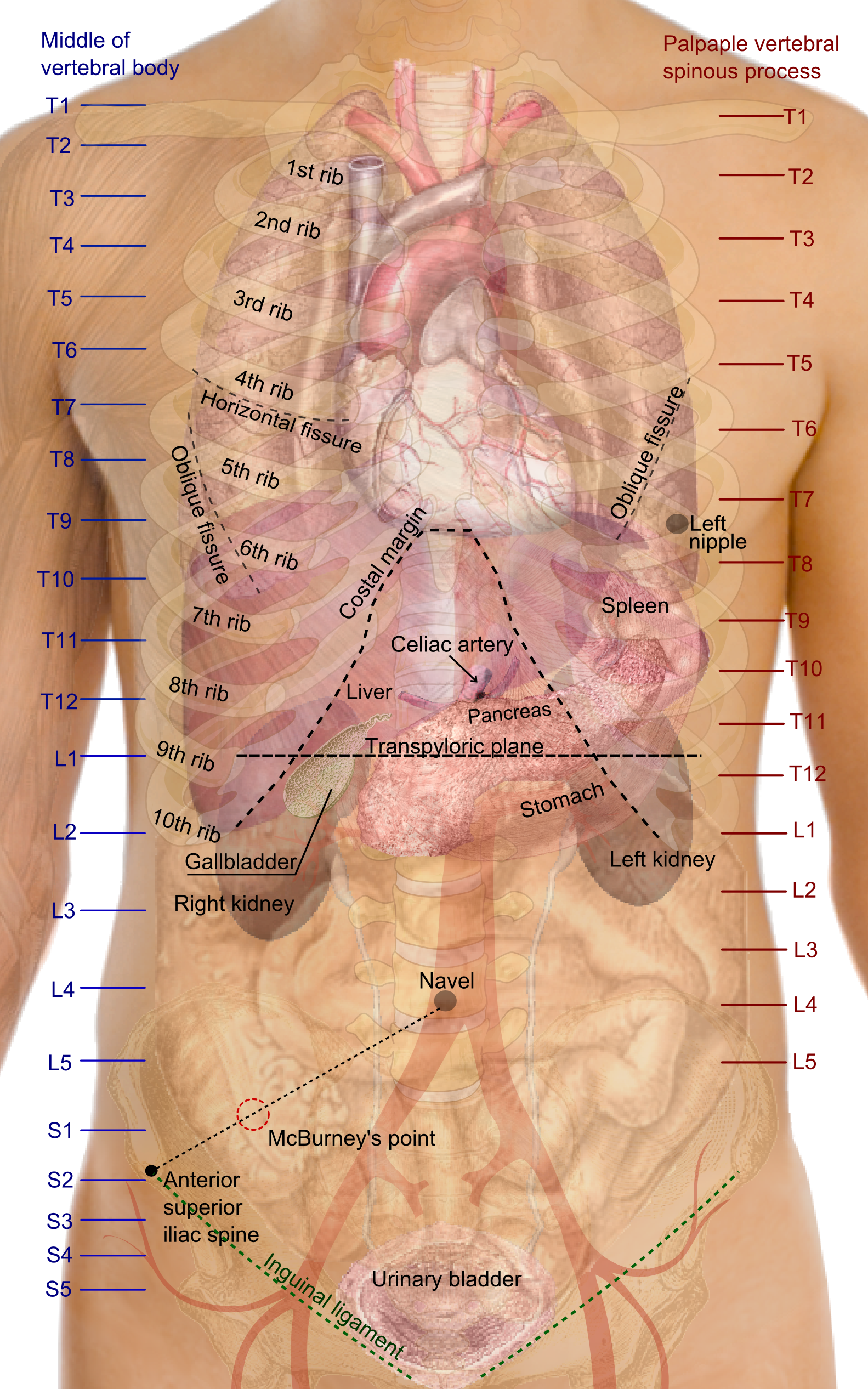
Surface projections of the organs of the trunk, from which organ locations are derived mainly from vertebra levels, ribs and the ilium

In the mid-line, a slight furrow extends from the xiphoid process above to the pubic symphysis below, representing the linea alba in the abdominal wall. At about its midpoint sits the umbilicus or navel. The rectus abdominis on each side of the linea alba stands out in muscular people. The outline of these muscles is interrupted by three or more transverse depressions indicating the tendinous intersections. There is usually one about the xiphoid process, one at the navel, and one in between. It is the combination of the linea alba and the tendinous intersections which form the abdominal "six-pack" sought after by many people.

The upper lateral limit of the abdomen is the subcostal margin (at or near the subcostal plane) formed by the cartilages of the false ribs (8, 9, 10) joining one another. The lower lateral limit is the anterior crest of the ilium and Poupart's ligament, which runs from the anterior superior spine of the ilium to the spine of the pubis. These lower limits are marked by visible grooves. Just above the pubic spines on either side are the external abdominal rings, which are openings in the muscular wall of the abdomen through which the spermatic cord emerges in the male, and through which an inguinal hernia may rupture.

One method by which the location of the abdominal contents can be appreciated is to draw three horizontal and two vertical lines.

===== Horizontal lines =====
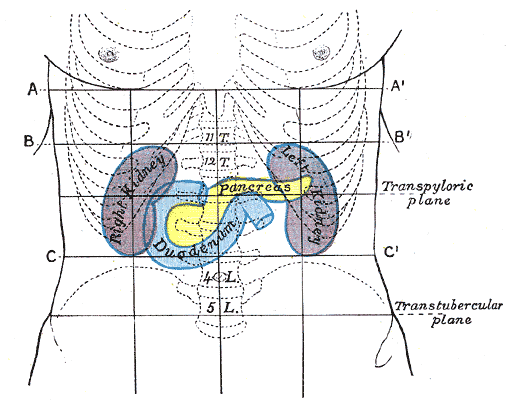
Front of abdomen, showing markings for duodenum, pancreas, and kidneys

- The highest of the former is the transpyloric line of C. Addison, which is situated halfway between the suprasternal notch and the top of the pubic symphysis, and often cuts the pyloric opening of the stomach an inch to the right of the mid-line. The hilum of each kidney is a little below it, while its left end approximately touches the lower limit of the spleen. It corresponds to the first lumbar vertebra behind.
- The second line is the subcostal line, drawn from the lowest point of the subcostal arch (tenth rib). It corresponds to the upper part of the third lumbar vertebra, and it is an inch or so above the umbilicus. It indicates roughly the transverse colon, the lower ends of the kidneys, and the upper limit of the transverse (3rd) part of the duodenum.
- The third line is called the intertubercular line, and runs across between the two rough tubercles, which can be felt on the outer lip of the crest of the ilium about two and a half inches (64 mm) from the anterior superior spine. This line corresponds to the body of the fifth lumbar vertebra, and passes through or just above the ileo-caecal valve, where the small intestine joins the large intestine.

===== Vertical lines =====
The two vertical or mid-Poupart lines are drawn from the point midway between the anterior superior spine and the pubic symphysis on each side, vertically upward to the costal margin.

- The right one is the most valuable, as the ileo-caecal valve is situated where it cuts the intertubercular line. The orifice of the appendix lies an inch lower, at McBurney's point. In its upper part, the vertical line meets the transpyloric line at the lower margin of the ribs, usually the ninth, and here the gallbladder is situated.
- The left mid-Poupart line corresponds in its upper three-quarters to the inner edge of the descending colon.

The right subcostal margin corresponds to the lower limit of the liver, while the right nipple is about half an inch above its upper limit.

=== Quadrants and regions ===
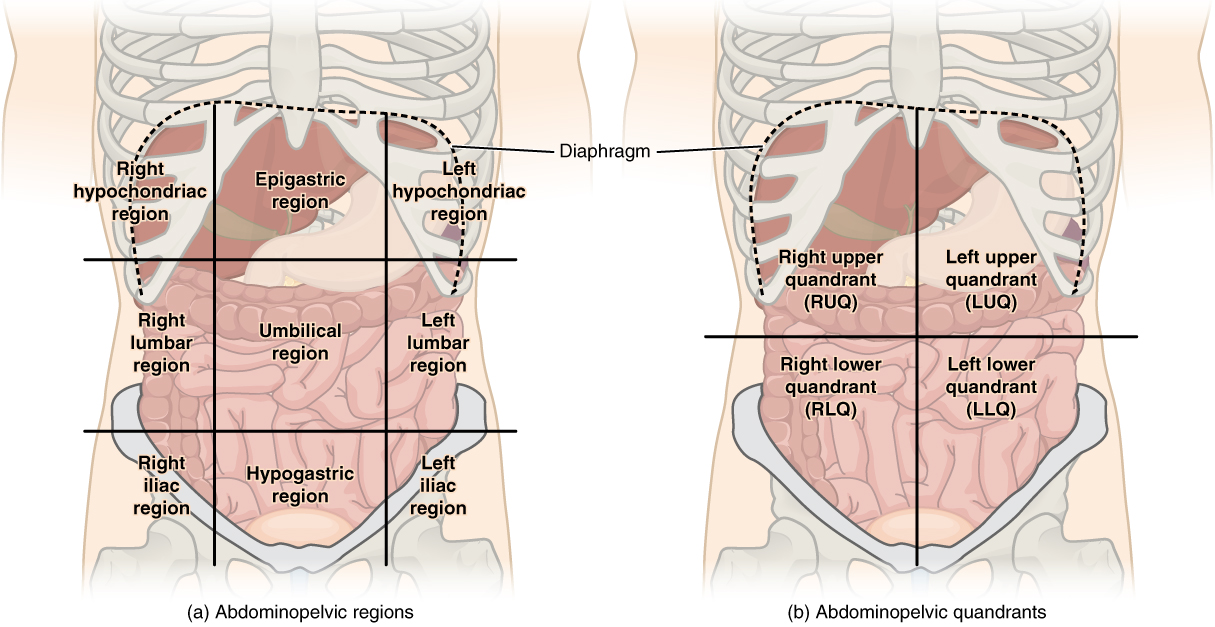
Side-by-side comparison of quadrants and regions

The abdomen can be divided into quadrants or regions to describe the location of an organ or structure. Classically, quadrants are described as the left upper, left lower, right upper, and right lower. Quadrants are also often used in describing the site of an abdominal pain.

The abdomen can also be divided into nine regions.

right hypochondriac/hypochondrium	epigastric/epigastrium	left hypochondriac/hypochondrium
right lumbar/flank/latus/lateral	umbilical	left lumbar/flank/latus/lateral
right inguinal/iliac	hypogastric/suprapubic	left inguinal/iliac

These terms stem from "hypo" meaning "below" and "epi" means "above", while "chondron" means "cartilage" (in this case, the cartilage of the rib) and "gaster" means stomach. The reversal of "left" and "right" is intentional, because the anatomical designations reflect the patient's own right and left.)

The "right iliac fossa" (RIF) is a common site of pain and tenderness in patients who have appendicitis. The fossa is named for the underlying iliac fossa of the hip bone, and thus is somewhat imprecise. Most of the anatomical structures that will produce pain and tenderness in this region are not in fact in the concavity of the ileum. However, the term is in common usage.

== Across animal phyla and classes ==
=== Chordata ===
==== Mammals ====
Abdominal organs can be highly specialized in some mammals. For example, the stomach of ruminants, (a suborder of mammals that includes cattle and sheep), is divided into four chambers – rumen, reticulum, omasum and abomasum.

=== Arthropoda ===
In arthropods, the abdomen is built up of a series of upper plates known as tergites and lower plates known as sternites, the whole being held together by a tough yet stretchable membrane.

==== Insects ====
The analogous gross morphologies of a human male and an ant

In the worker ant, the abdomen consists of the propodeum fused to the thorax and the metasoma, itself divided into the narrow petiole and bulbous gaster.

In insects, the abdomen contains the insect's digestive tract and reproductive organs. It consists of eleven segments in most orders of insects, though the eleventh segment is absent in the adult of most higher orders. The number of these segments does vary from species to species with the number of segments visible reduced to only seven in the common honey bee. In the Collembola (springtails), the abdomen has only six segments.

The abdomen is sometimes highly modified. In Apocrita (bees, ants and wasps), the first segment of the abdomen is fused to the thorax and is called the propodeum. In ants, the second segment forms the narrow petiole. Some ants have an additional postpetiole segment, and the remaining segments form the bulbous gaster. The petiole and gaster (abdominal segments 2 and onward) are collectively called the metasoma.

Unlike other arthropods, insects possess no legs on the abdomen in adult form, though the Protura do have rudimentary leg-like appendages on the first three abdominal segments, and Archaeognatha possess small, articulated "styli" which are sometimes considered to be rudimentary appendages. Many larval insects including the Lepidoptera and the Symphyta (sawflies) have fleshy appendages called prolegs on their abdominal segments (as well as their more familiar thoracic legs), which allow them to grip onto the edges of plant leaves as they walk around.

==== Arachnida ====
In arachnids (spiders, scorpions and relatives), the term "abdomen" is used interchangeably with "opisthosoma" ("hind body"), which is the body section posterior to that bearing the legs and head (the prosoma or cephalothorax).

== See also ==
- Abdominal fat
