= Median plane =

Anatomical plane, bisects the body vertically through the midline marked by the navel

- Human anatomy planes, with median plane in red.

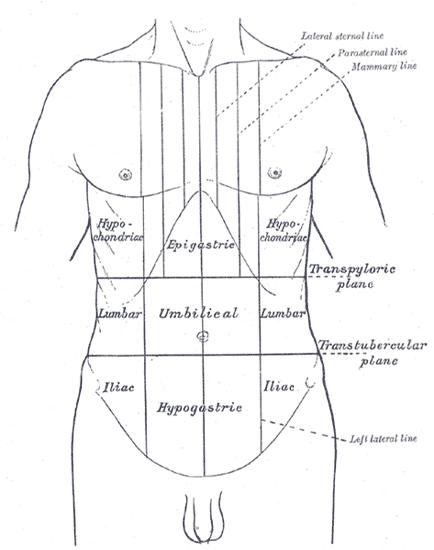
- Surface lines of the front of the thorax and abdomen.

Details

Identifiers
- Latin: planum medianum
- FMA: 49450

Whether in reference to the anatomy of the human or other members of the Bilateria, the median plane, also called the midsagittal plane and related terms, is used to describe the sagittal plane as it bisects the body vertically through the midline marked by the navel, dividing the body exactly in left and right side. The term parasagittal plane is used to refer to any plane parallel to the sagittal and median plane.

It is one of the lines used to define the right upper quadrant of the human abdomen.

The midsternal line can be interpreted as a segment of the median plane.

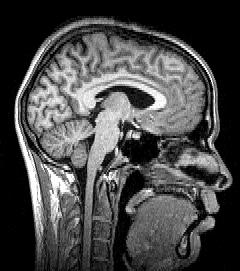
Median plane magnetic resonance imaging of the head.

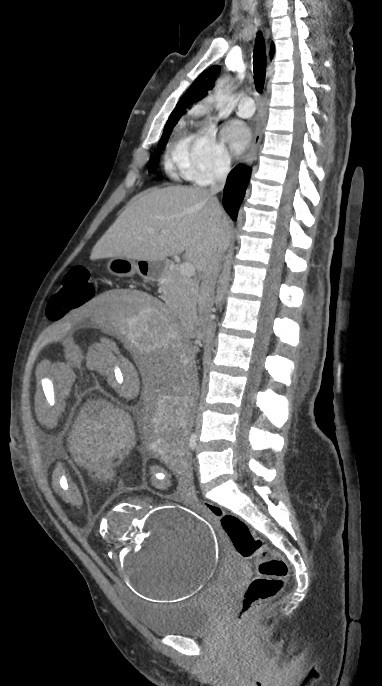
Median plane CT scan of a pregnant woman. The fetus (exposed in the coronal plane) is 37 weeks of gestational age.
