= Coronal plane =

Any vertical anatomical plane that divides the body into ventral and dorsal sections

- The main anatomical planes of the human body, including sagittal or median (red), parasagittal (yellow), frontal or coronal plane (blue) and transverse or axial plane (green)

Details

Identifiers
- Latin: plana coronalia
- TA98: A01.2.00.001
- TA2: 48
- FMA: 12246

The coronal plane (also known as the frontal plane) is an anatomical plane that divides the body into dorsal and ventral sections. It is perpendicular to the sagittal and transverse planes.

== Details ==
The coronal plane is an example of a longitudinal plane. For a human, the mid-coronal plane would transect a standing body into two halves (front and back, or ventral and dorsal) in an imaginary line that cuts through both shoulders. The description of the coronal plane applies to most animals as well as humans even though humans walk upright and the various planes are usually shown in the vertical orientation.

The sternal plane (planum sternale) is a coronal plane which transects the front of the sternum.

== Etymology ==
The term is derived from Latin corona ('garland, crown'), from Ancient Greek κορώνη (korōnē, 'garland, wreath'). The coronal plane is so called because it lies in the same direction as the coronal suture.

== Additional images ==
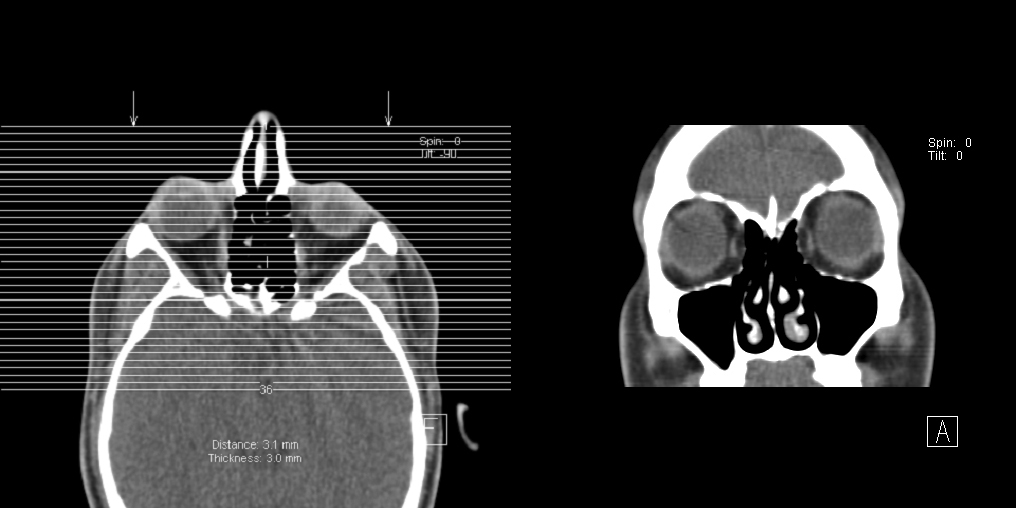
CT scan of the paranasal sinuses with coronal reconstruction (right) and axial planning data (left).

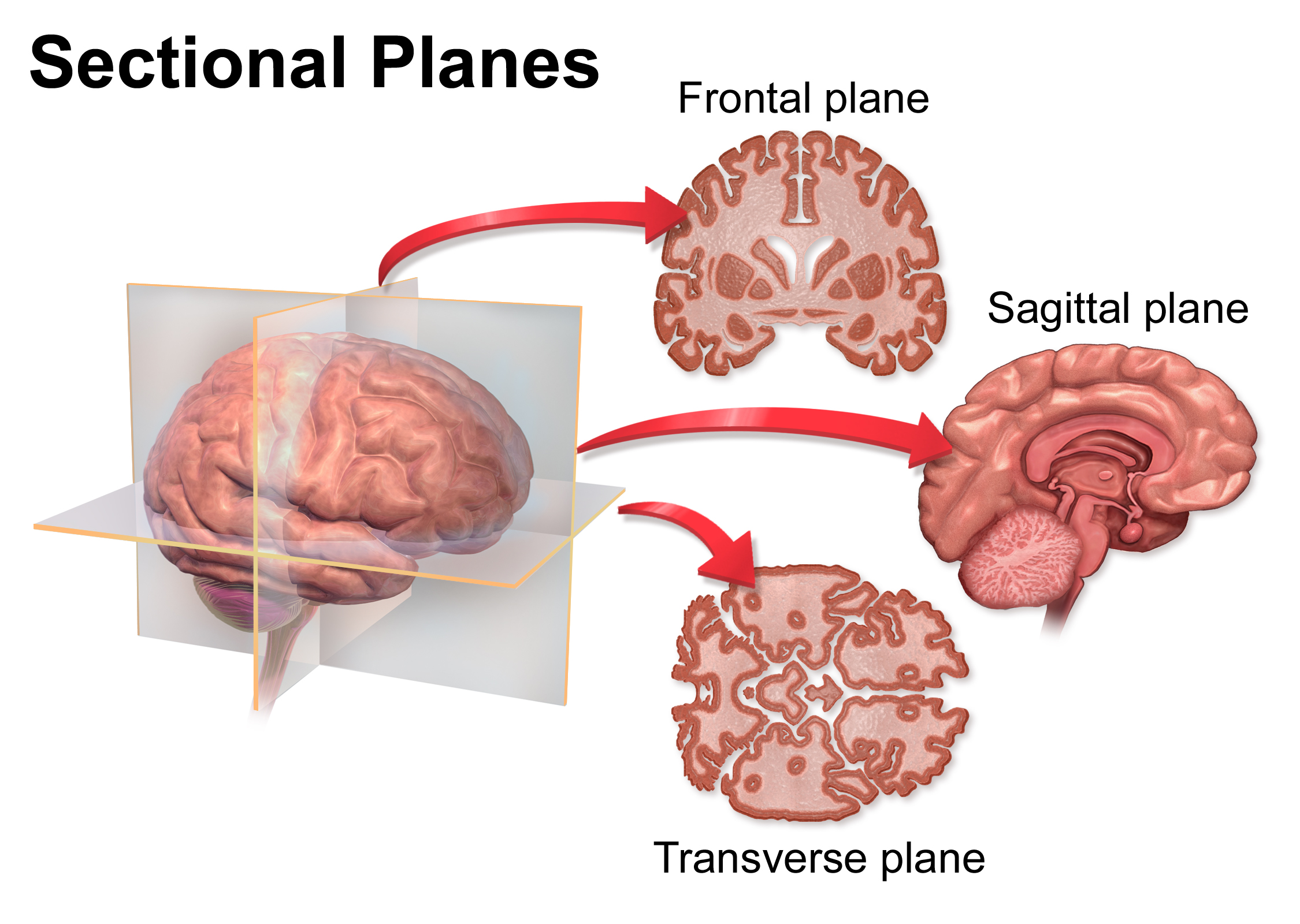
Sectional planes of the brain

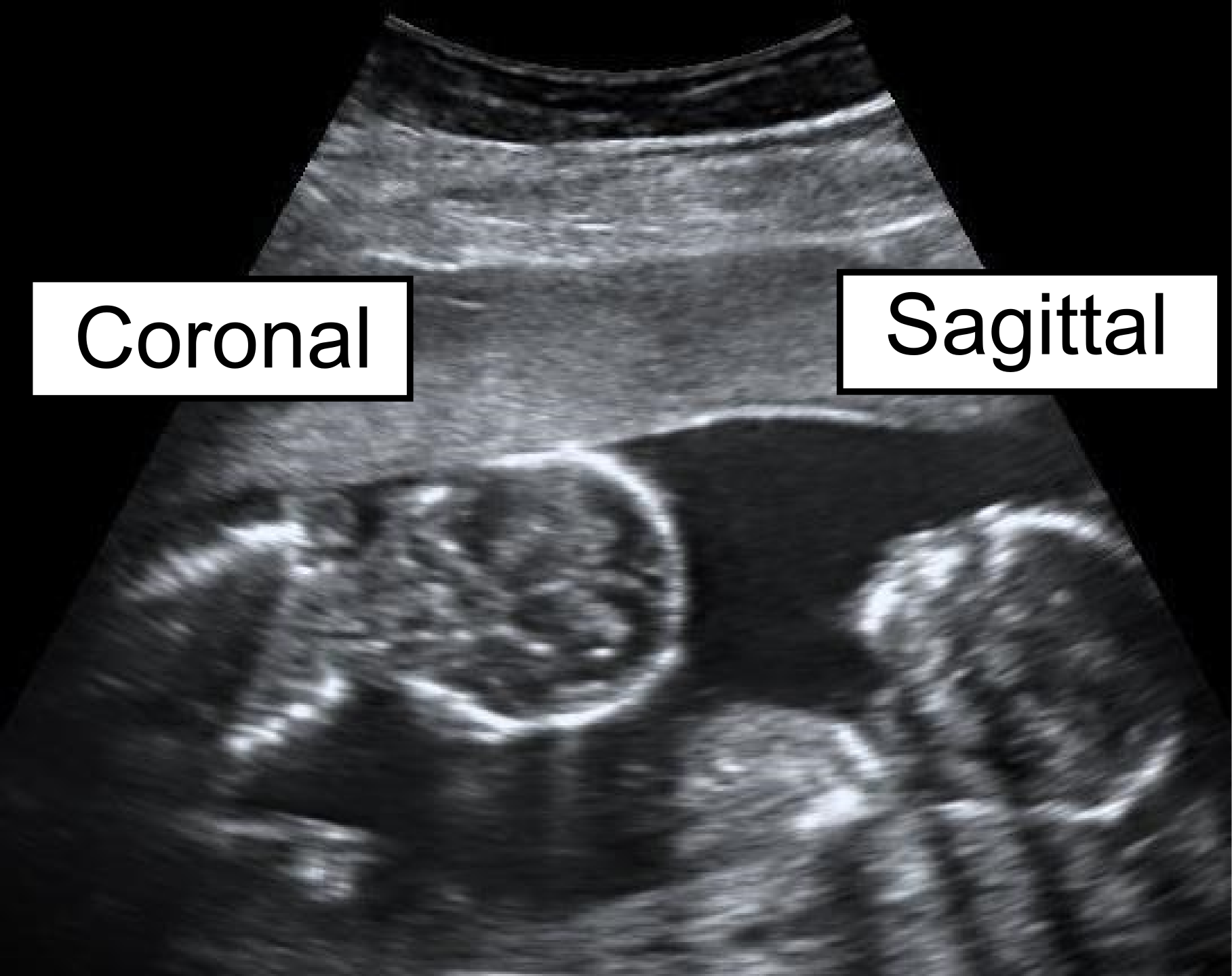
Identical twins at a gestational age of 15 weeks, shown in coronal and sagittal plane, respectively

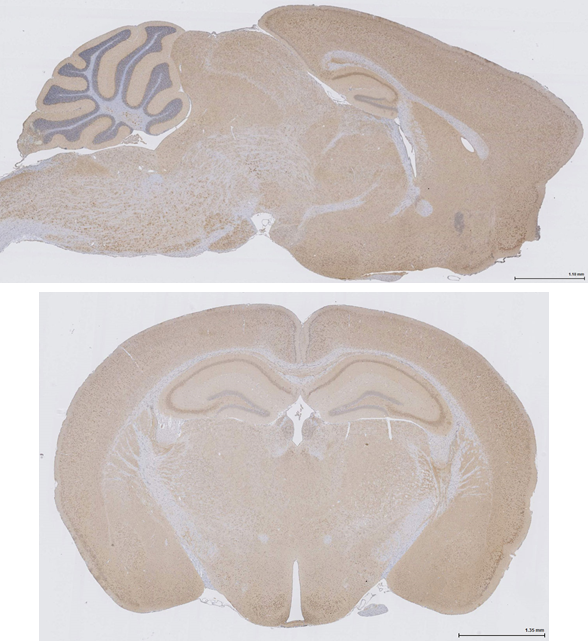
Sagittal section (top) vs. coronal section (bottom) of a mouse brain

== See also ==
- Anatomical terms of location
- Sagittal plane
- Transverse plane
