= Costal margin =

Lower edge of the chest (thorax) formed by the bottom edge of the rib cage

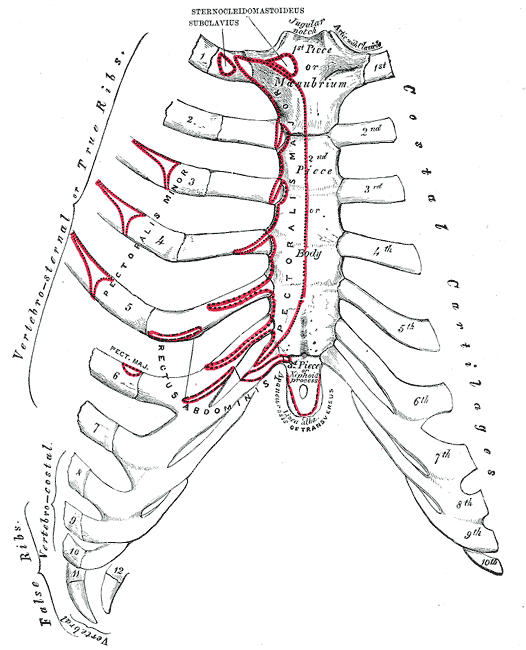
- Anterior surface of sternum and costal cartilages. (The costal margin forms a large upside-down V on the inferior border.)

Details

Identifiers
- Latin: arcus costalis
- TA98: A02.3.04.006
- TA2: 1101
- FMA: 7569

The costal margin, also known as the costal arch, is the lower edge of the chest (thorax) formed by the bottom edge of the rib cage.

== Structure ==
The costal margin is the medial margin formed by the cartilages of the seventh to tenth ribs. It attaches to the body and xiphoid process of the sternum.

The thoracic diaphragm attaches to the costal margin.

The costal angle is the angle between the left and right costal margins where they join the sternum.

== Function ==
The costal margins somewhat protect the higher abdominal organs, such as the liver.

== Clinical significance ==
The costal margin may be used for tissue harvesting of cartilage for use elsewhere in the body, such as to treat microtia.

Different abdominal organs may be palpated just below the costal margin, such as the liver on the right side of the body.

Pain across the costal margin is most commonly caused by costochondritis.

The costal paradox, also known as Hoover's sign and the costal margin paradox, is a sign where the costal angle decreases upon inspiration rather than increasing, indicating chronic obstructive pulmonary disease.
