= Transumbilical plane =

Transverse plane in human anatomy

- The main anatomical planes of the human body, including the median (red), parasagittal or paramedian (yellow), coronal (blue) and transverse (green). In this case, the transverse plane is a transumbilical plane because it passes through the navel.

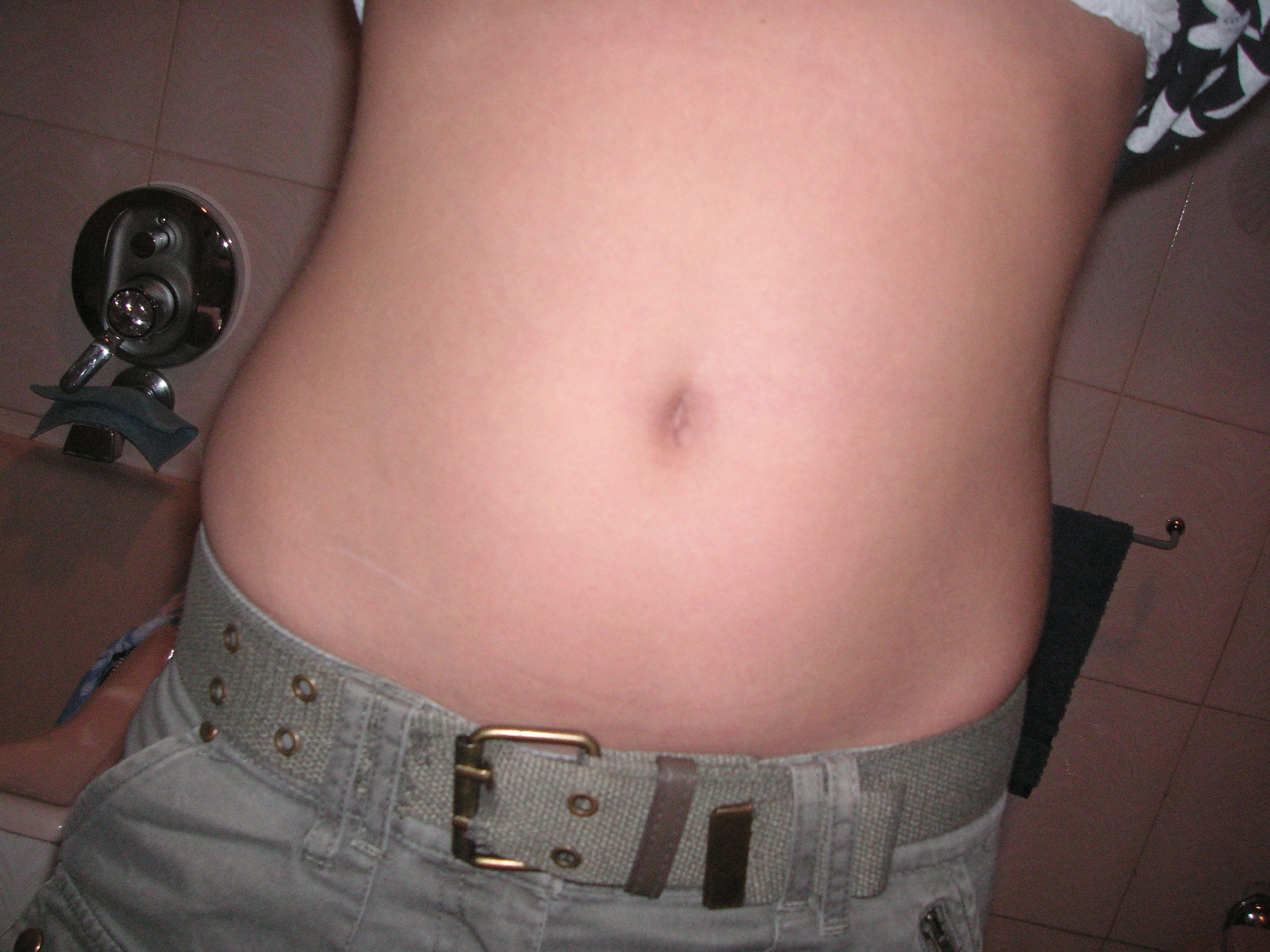
- Umbilicus (navel)

Details

Identifiers
- Latin: planum transumbilicalis

The transumbilical plane or umbilical plane, one of the transverse planes in human anatomy, is a horizontal line that passes through the abdomen at the level of the navel (or umbilicus). It also intersects the intervertebral disc between the third (L3) and fourth (L4) lumbar vertebrae. This horizontal anatomical plane lies about half an inch above the level of the supracristal plane. In physical examination, clinicians use the transumbilical plane and its intersection with the median plane to divide the abdomen into four quadrants.

== See also ==
- Interspinous plane
- Transpyloric plane
- Supracristal plane
