= Interspinous plane =

The interspinous plane (Planum interspinale) is an anatomical transverse plane that passes through the anterior superior iliac spines. It separates the lateral lumbar region from the inguinal region and the umbilical region from the pubic region. Posteriorly, this anatomical plane passes through the upper border of the first sacral vertebra (i.e., the sacral promontory) .
