= J. Paul Fedoroff =

Canadian forensic psychiatrist and sexologist

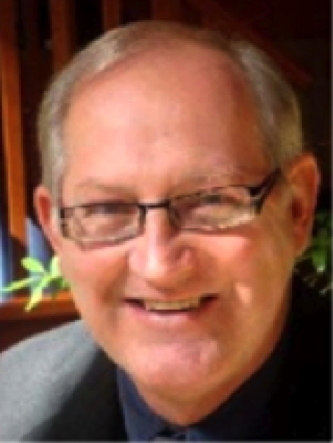
J. Paul Fedoroff in 2013

John Paul Fedoroff (August 23, 1958 – January 16, 2023) was a Canadian forensic psychiatrist, sexologist, and researcher who specialized in treating individuals with certain problematic paraphilias and/or individuals with developmental delay. He was the first director of the Sexual Behaviours Clinic (SBC) at the Institute of Mental Health Research at the Royal Ottawa Mental Health Centre located in Ottawa, Ontario. He was a full professor of forensic psychiatry, criminology, and law at the University of Ottawa.

Fedoroff was known for his research on assessing and treating individuals who have unusual sexual interests (known as paraphilic interests) who have committed sexual offences. One of his research articles claimed to prove that pedophilia could be eliminated, but his conclusions were dismissed by the scientific community.

== Biography ==
=== Early life and education ===
John Paul Fedoroff was born and raised in Saskatoon, Saskatchewan. He is the son of Sergey Fedoroff, the fourth president of the Pan American Association of Anatomy (1975–1978), who is considered the father of tissue culture for his research in tissue culture and nerve cell regeneration.

=== Career ===
Fedoroff worked at several psychiatry sites as a staff psychiatrist, including Johns Hopkins School of Medicine, Toronto Hospital, Whitby Medical Health Centre, and Centre for Addiction and Mental Health (CAMH).

== Views ==
=== Pedophilia ===
Psychiatrist Paul Fedoroff and the ROMHC have come under criticism for claims they could eliminate pedophilia, despite the medical consensus of the opposite. In 2014, Fedoroff claimed his program can treat pedophilia and other disorders "so successfully that people who were aroused by children, exhibitionism or rape can eventually lead healthy, consensual sex lives." This contrasted with other experts who said, "There is absolutely, positively no evidence that we can cure 'a paraphilic disorder'".

Fedoroff based his claim on his study of 43 men showed pedophilia on a phallometric test (where the men's erection responses were measured). When these men were tested again, 21 of them showed less response to children and more response to adults. The study was strongly criticized, with experts noting that Fedoroff's measurement technique was unreliable and could be manipulated by the test-takers trying to look normal, and that the finding was actually a statistical illusion caused by a phenomenon called regression to the mean. According to sex researcher J. Michael Bailey, "I think his data were not appreciably different than random coin tossing...Extraordinary claims require extraordinary evidence, and yet Paul's paper is extraordinarily weak."

In 2016, Andreas Mokros and Elmar Habermeyer, sex researchers at the University Hospital of Zurich used Fedoroff's original data and applied statistical modelling of Fedoroff's method to test its validity. Their results verified the previous criticisms, showing directly that Fedoroff's method was invalid and that his reported finding was actually a statistical artefact, indistinguishable from random variation. Fedoroff dismissed the analyses and criticisms, however, saying they "are concerns to be raised about any un-replicated study" and asking "Why all the fuss about this one, especially since the news appears to be good?"

In 2017, Fedoroff and the ROMHC continued their claims of success (called a "boast" by the National Post). According to Fedoroff, "We have evidence all day from people who say they’ve gotten better.....People always come back saying ‘This is much better, I enjoy this so much more than what I used to go through". According to Professor Martin Lalumiere of the University of Ottawa, standard treatment focuses on strategies to avoid trouble (such as avoiding situations where the person is alone with children). In the method Fedoroff describes, pedophiles are taught to find sexual stimulation from people their own age, in repeated sessions using adult pornography as practice. According to James Cantor, a sex researcher known for his MRI studies of pedophilia, what ROHMC clinic is doing is equivalent to the failed “conversion therapy” of homosexuality. Fedoroff's response to the National Post was that there is no evidence that pedophilia cannot be altered and that he and his team are "working on" studies to prove their claims. Fedoroff also promoted his "treatment" in the United States, the Czech Republic and Russia.

== Awards and honours ==
In 2015, Fedoroff was the president of the International Academy of Sex Research (IASR) and the Canadian Association of Psychiatry and the Law. He was also awarded as Specialist of the Year from the Royal College of Physicians and Surgeons of Canada in the same year. During the same year, his work was also recognized by the American Psychiatric Association (APA). The APA awarded the Sexual Behaviours Clinic with the Gold Achievement Award. The Gold Achievement Award is the highest honour from the APA for excellence in academic clinical research program in North America.

In 2017, he was awarded the Earl L. Loschen Award for Clinical Practice from the National Association for the Dually Diagnosed (NADD).

In 2018, the Sexual Behaviours Clinic was awarded the Innovation Award from Crime Prevention Ottawa for community safety. This award was given for his team's work in preventing sex crimes in the community by treating individuals who are at risk of committing them.

== Bibliography ==
Fedoroff published over 100 research articles and book chapters, and over 200 scientific presentations and talks around the world.
