= Agur (disambiguation) =

Agur ben Jakeh was a sage who compiled Proverbs 30.

Agur may also refer to:

- Proverbs 30, sometimes called the Book of Agur
- Agur (Jacob Landau), 15th-century halakhic digest compiled by Jacob ben Judah Landau
- Agur, Israel, a village in central Israel
- Agur Jaunak (greetings, gentlemen), a Basque song
- Saint Agur Blue, a French cheese
- Rein Agur, Estonian puppet theatre director
- Zvia Agur, Israeli mathematical biologist
- Anne Agur (1953–2026), Canadian clinical anatomist
