= Keith L. Moore =

Canadian anatomist (1925–2019)

Keith L. Moore FIAC, FRSM, FAAA
- Born: Keith Leon Moore; 5 October 1925; Brantford, Ontario, Canada
- Died: 25 November 2019 (aged 94)
- Education: Stratford Collegiate Vocational Institute, University of Western Ontario (BA 1949, MS 1951, PhD 1954)
- Occupation: lecturer
- Years active: 1956–1993
- Employer: University of Toronto
- Organization(s): Division of Anatomy, Dept of Surgery
- Known for: Clinical Anatomy
- Notable work: Clinically Oriented Anatomy
- Awards: 2007 Henry Gray/Elsevier Distinguished Educator Award

Keith Leon Moore (5 October 1925 - 25 November 2019) was a professor in the division of anatomy, in the faculty of Surgery, at the University of Toronto, Ontario, Canada. Moore was associate dean for Basic Medical Sciences in the university's faculty of Medicine and was Chair of Anatomy from 1976 to 1984. He was a founding member of the American Association of Clinical Anatomists (AACA) and was President of the AACA between 1989 and 1991.

Moore has co-written (with Arthur F. Dalley and Anne M. R. Agur) Clinically Oriented Anatomy, an English-language anatomy textbook. He also co-wrote (with Professor Anne M. R. Agur and Professor Arthur F. Dalley) Essential Clinical Anatomy.

== Awards ==
The American Association of Clinical Anatomists awarded Moore, the previous president, with their Honored Member Award (in 1994). The American Association of Anatomists awarded him the Henry Gray/Elsevier Distinguished Educator Award in 2007 for human anatomy education in the anatomical sciences.

Further awards, appointments and honors include:

- The Queens Diamond Jubilee Medal was awarded to Moore in Barrie in 2012

== Embryology in the Qur'an ==
In 1980, Moore was invited to Saudi Arabia to lecture on anatomy and embryology at King Abdulaziz University. While he was there, Moore was approached by the Embryology Committee of King Abdulaziz University for his assistance in reinterpreting certain verses in the Qur’an and some sayings in the Hadiths which referred to human reproduction and embryological development. Moore said that he was amazed at the scientific accuracy of some of the statements which were made in the 7th century.

For the past three years, I have worked with the Embryology Committee of King Abdulaziz University in Jeddah, Saudi Arabia, helping them reinterpret the many statements in the Qur’an, Sunnah, Kabbalah and Talmud referring to human reproduction and prenatal development. At first, I was astonished by the accuracy of the statements that were recorded in the 7th century AD, before the science of embryology was established.

Moore worked with the Embryology Committee on a comparative study of the Qur’an, the Hadith and modern embryology. The Committee presented and published several papers with Moore and others co-authoring a number of papers.

A special edition of Moore's medical school textbook, The Developing Human: Clinically Oriented Embryology, was published for the Muslim world in 1983. The Developing Human: Clinically Oriented Embryology with Islamic Additions, included "pages with embryology-related Quranic verse and hadith" by co-author Abdul Majeed al-Zindani.

In 2002, Moore declined to be interviewed by the Wall Street Journal on the subject of his work on Islam, stating that "it's been ten or eleven years since I was involved in the Qur'an."

Moore's works have been used for religious purposes, which has not been without scientific criticism, with the most well-known coming from fellow developmental biologist PZ Myers, who states that Moore's views expressed in his works were "ridiculous claims" and "pareidolia run amuck and swamping out actual scientific information for the sake of propping up useless superstitions." Physicist Taner Edis criticized him and Maurice Bucaille for reading modern medical details into vague and general statements in the Qur'an. For example, Moore recites the Quran as saying that an early human embryo looks like "a leech-like structure" (Sura 23:14).
