= Maurice Bucaille =

French scientist, physician and author (1920–1998)

- Born: Maurice Henri Jules Bucaille; 19 July 1920; Pont-l'Évêque, Calvados, France
- Died: 17 February 1998 (aged 77); Paris, France
- Occupations: Physician; scientist; author
- Notable work: Mummies of the Pharaohs – Modern Medical Investigations and The Bible, The Qur'an and Science
- Spouses: Jaqueline Florisse Henriette Legrand (m. 1943; div. 1948); Ginette Bucaille (m. 1949; div. 1955); Jeannine Mathilde Monnot (m. 1958)
- Awards: History Prize from the Académie Française; French National Academy of Medicine Award

Maurice Bucaille (French pronunciation: [moris bykaj]; 19 July 1920 – 17 February 1998) was a French doctor known primarily for his book The Bible, The Qur'an and Science.

== Career ==
Maurice Bucaille was a specialist in the field of gastroenterology. In 1973, he was appointed as the family physician of Faisal of Saudi Arabia. His patients included the members of the family of Egyptian President Anwar Sadat.

In 1976, Bucaille published a book titled The Bible, The Qur'an and Science following his study of the mummy of the Egyptian pharaoh Ramesses II. The book contained multiple references to the Quran, relating science and Quran in which Bucaille concluded that the Quran is a divine revelation and that it was not written by any man. The book gave rise to a movement called Bucailleism, which tries to relate modern science with religion, especially Islam. Since the publishing of The Bible, the Quran and Science, Bucaillists have promoted the idea that the Quran is of divine origin, arguing that it contains scientifically and historically correct facts. According to The Wall Street Journal, Bucailleism is "in some ways the Muslim counterpart to Christian creationism" and although "while creationism rejects much of modern science, Bucailleism embraces it."

== Approach to Scripture and Modern Science ==
Maurice Bucaille is renowned for his efforts to demonstrate the compatibility of Islamic teachings with modern scientific knowledge. His most influential work, The Bible, The Qur'an and Science, published in 1976, examines the scriptures of Judaism, Christianity, and Islam in the context of contemporary scientific discoveries. Bucaille concluded that the Qur'an contains statements consistent with modern science, suggesting its divine origin.

One of Bucaille's notable claims involves the Qur'anic account of Pharaoh's body being preserved as a sign for future generations (Qur'an 10:92). He linked this verse to the discovery of the mummy of Ramesses II, suggesting that the physical preservation of the Pharaoh's body corroborates the Qur'anic narrative.

== Publications ==
- La Bible, le Coran et la Science : Les Écritures Saintes examinées à la lumière des connaissances modernes, Seghers 1976, (ISBN 978-2221501535), Pocket 2003, (ISBN 978-2266131032)
- Les Momies des pharaons et la médecine, Séguier, 1987 (ISBN 2906284475). Mummies of the Pharaohs: Modern Medical Investigations by Maurice Bucaille. Translated by Alastair D. Pannell and the author. Illustrated. 236 pp. New York: St. Martin's Press.
- Réflexions sur le Coran, with Mohamed Talbi, Seghers, (Reflections on the Koran), 1989 (ISBN 2232101487).
- L'homme d'où vient-il? Les réponses de la science et des Écritures Saintes (Where does man come from? The responses of science and Scripture), Seghers, 1980 7ème éd.(ISBN 2221007816).
  - Bucaille, Maurice (1982). What is the origin of man? : the answers of science and the Holy Scriptures. Paris: Seghers. ISBN 9782221011010.
- Moïse et Pharaon; Les Hébreux en Egypte; (Moses and Pharaoh, The Hebrews in Egypt) Quelles concordances de Livres saints avec l'Histoire, Seghers, 1995 (ISBN 2-232-10466-4).

== See also ==
- Keith L. Moore
- Islam and science
- Religion and science
- Henry John Klassen
