= Sergey Fedoroff =

Sergey Fedoroff (1925, Latvia – 2012, Canada) was a researcher in tissue cultures, who helped establish that it was impossible to regenerate nerve cells. He was president of the Pan American Association of Anatomy from 1975 to 1978. He was a recipient of the Society for In Vitro Biology's Lifetime Achievement Award in 1999.

He was the father of J. Paul Fedoroff.
