= Nadd =

Nadd or NADD may refer to:

- Nad, County Cork, Ireland, a village, also spelled 'Nadd'
- Freedon Nadd, a Star Wars Legends character
- National Alliance for Democracy and Development, a political alliance in The Gambia
- National Association for the Dually Diagnosed, United States, advocates for people with mental health disorders alongside developmental disabilities
- National Association for the Deaf and Dumb, predecessor of the British Deaf Association, a charity
