= Terminologia Anatomica =

International standard on human anatomical terminology

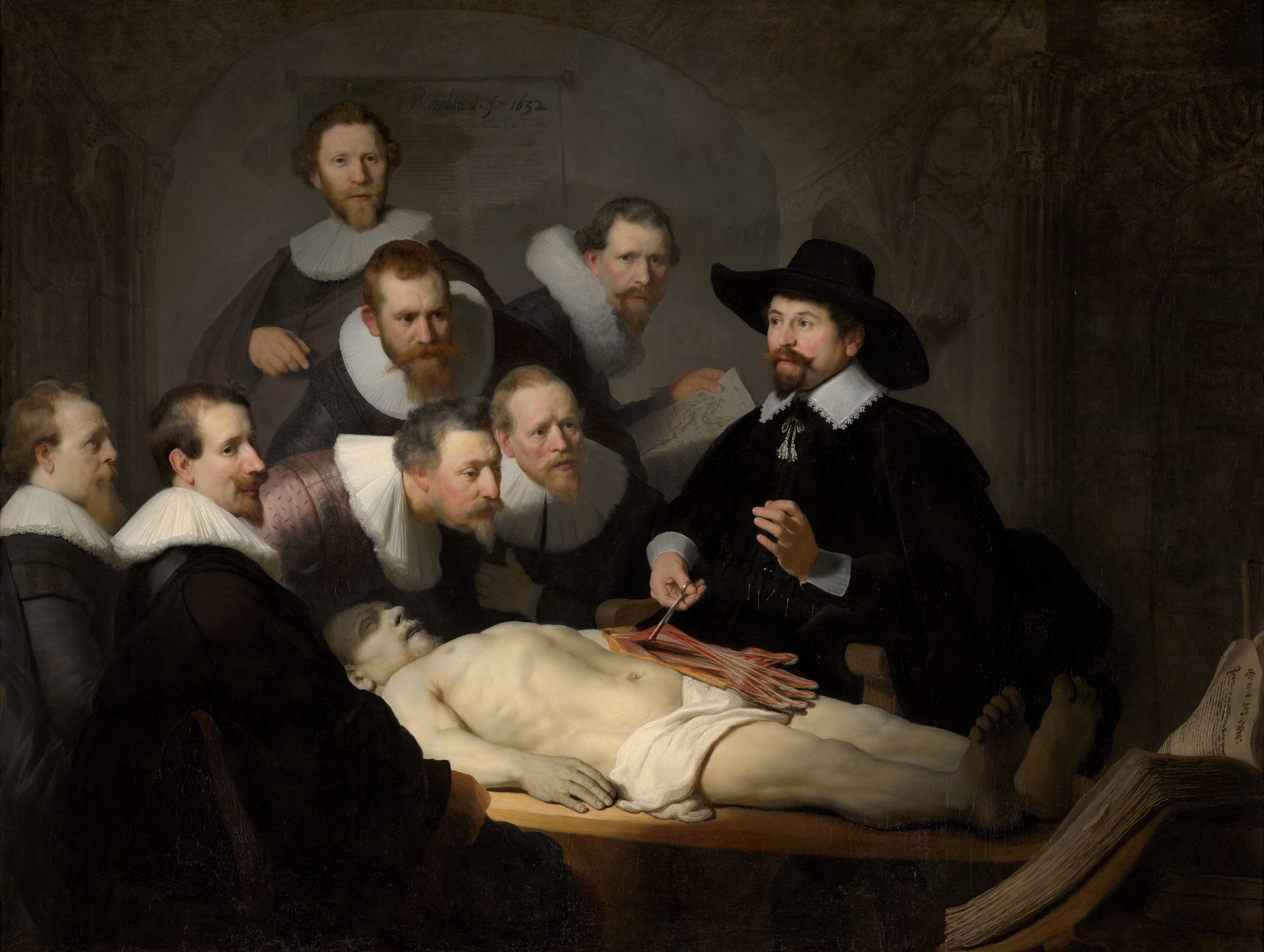
The Anatomy Lesson of Dr. Nicolaes Tulp, an oil painting by Rembrandt.

Terminologia Anatomica (commonly abbreviated TA) is the international standard for the controlled vocabulary of human anatomical terminology. It is developed by the Federative International Programme on Anatomical Terminology (FIPAT), a program of the International Federation of Associations of Anatomists (IFAA).

== History ==
The sixth edition of the previous standard, Nomina Anatomica, was released in 1989. The first edition of Terminologia Anatomica, superseding Nomina Anatomica, was developed by the Federative Committee on Anatomical Terminology (FCAT) and the International Federation of Associations of Anatomists (IFAA) and released in 1998. In April 2011, this edition was published online by the Federative International Programme on Anatomical Terminologies (FIPAT), the successor of FCAT. The first edition contained 7635 Latin items.

The second edition was released online by FIPAT in 2019 and approved and adopted by the IFAA General Assembly in 2020. The latest errata is dated August 2021. It contains a total of 7112 numbered terms (1-7113 skipping 2590), with some terms repeated.

== Adoption and reception ==
A 2014 survey of the American Association of Clinical Anatomists found that the TA preferred term had the highest frequency of usage in only 53% of the 25 anatomical terms surveyed, and was highest or second-highest for 92% of terms. 75% of respondents were unfamiliar with FIPAT and TA.

In a panel at the 2022 International Federation of Associations of Anatomists Congress, author Dr. Kyle McLeister stated "the Terminologia Anatomica generally receives no attention in medical terminology courses", but stressed its importance. The TA is not well established in other languages, such as French. The English equivalent names are often inconsistent if viewed as translations of the accompanying Latin phrases.

The Terminologia Anatomica specifically excludes eponyms, as they were determined to "give absolutely no anatomical information about the named structure, and vary considerably between countries and cultures". In a 2023 study of eight gynecologic eponyms, the TA term was preferred in two cases, and showed a significant trend towards TA adoption in three others, leaving three non-TA terms likely to remain in common use.

== Categories of anatomical structures ==
Terminologia Anatomica is divided into 16 chapters grouped into five parts. The official terms are in Latin. Although equivalent English-language terms are provided, only the official Latin terms are used as the basis for creating lists of equivalent terms in other languages.

=== Part I ===
==== Chapter 1: General anatomy ====
1. General terms
2. Reference planes
3. Reference lines
4. Human body positions
5. Movements
6. Parts of human body
7. Regions of human body

=== Part II: Musculoskeletal systems ===
==== Chapter 2: Bones ====
1. Axial skeleton
2. Appendicular skeleton
3. Bones
4. Cranium
5. Extracranial bones of head
6. Auditory ossicles
7. Teeth
8. Nasal cartilages
9. Cartilages of ear
10. Laryngeal cartilages
11. Vertebral column
12. Thoracic skeleton
13. Bones of upper limb
14. Bony pelvis
15. Bones of lower limb
16. Joints

==== Chapter 3: Joints ====
1. Joints of skull
2. Joints of auditory ossicles
3. Laryngeal joints
4. Joints of vertebral column
5. Thoracic joints
6. Joints of upper limb
7. Joints of lower limb

==== Chapter 4: Muscular system ====
1. Cranial part of muscular system
2. Cervical part of muscular system
3. Dorsal part of muscular system
4. Thoracic part of muscular system
5. Abdominal part of muscular system
6. Pelvic part of muscular system
7. Muscular system of upper limb
8. Muscular system of lower limb

=== Part III: Visceral systems ===
==== Chapter 5: Digestive system ====
1. Mouth
2. Fauces
3. Pharynx
4. Digestive canal
5. Liver
6. Gallbladder
7. Extrahepatic bile ducts
8. Pancreas

==== Chapter 6: Respiratory system ====
1. Nose
2. Paranasal sinuses
3. Larynx
4. Tracheobronchial tree
5. Lungs

==== Chapter 7: Thoracic cavity ====
1. Pleural cavity
2. Mediastinum

==== Chapter 8: Urinary system ====
1. Kidney
2. Ureter
3. Urinary bladder
4. Urethra

==== Chapter 9: Genital systems ====
1. Female genital system
2. Male genital system

=== Part IV: Integrating systems I ===
==== Chapter 11: Endocrine glands ====
1. Hypophysis
2. Pineal gland
3. Thyroid gland
4. Parathyroid glands
5. Suprarenal gland
6. Paraganglia

==== Chapter 12: Cardiovascular system ====
1. Blood
2. Lymph
3. Vessels
4. Vascular plexuses
5. Heart
6. Pulmonary vessels
7. Cardiac vessels
8. Systemic arteries
9. Systemic veins
10. Great lymphatic vessels

==== Chapter 13: Lymphoid organs ====
1. Primary lymphoid organs
2. Secondary lymphoid organs

=== Part V: Integrating systems II ===
==== Chapter 14: Nervous system ====
1. Central nervous system
2. Peripheral nervous system
3. Autonomic division of peripheral nervous system

==== Chapter 15: Sense organs ====
1. Olfactory organ
2. Eye
3. Ear
4. Gustatory organ

==== Chapter 16: The integument ====
1. Skin
2. Skin appendages
3. Subcutaneous tissue
4. Breast
5. Scalp
6. Blood

== See also ==
- Terminologia Embryologica
- Terminologia Histologica
- Foundational Model of Anatomy, an ontology using current naming conventions
- Anatomical terminology
