= Nomina Anatomica =

International standard on human anatomic terminology

Nomina Anatomica (NA) was the international standard on human anatomic terminology from 1895 until it was replaced by Terminologia Anatomica in 1998.

In the late nineteenth century some 30,000 terms for various body parts were in use. The same structures were described by different names, depending (among other things) on the anatomist's school and national tradition. Vernacular translations of Latin and Greek, as well as various eponymous terms, were barriers to effective international communication. There was disagreement and confusion among anatomists regarding anatomical terminology.

== Editions ==
The first and last entries in the following table are not NA editions, but they are included for the sake of continuity. Although these early editions were authorized by different bodies, they are sometimes considered part of the same series.

Before these codes of terminology, approved at anatomists congresses, the usage of anatomical terms was based on authoritative works of scholars like Galen, Berengario da Carpi, Gaspard Bauhin, Henle, Hyrtl, etc.

Edition	Year	Notes
Basle Nomina; Anatomica (BNA), 1st ed.	1895	Work on a new international system of anatomical terminology began in 1887. The system was approved in 1895 by the Ninth Congress of the Anatomische Gesellschaft in Basel (then "Basle"), Switzerland. It became known as the Basle Nomina Anatomica (BNA). The BNA reduced the number of anatomical terms from 50,000 down to 5,528. The International Federation of Associations of Anatomists (IFAA) is the international body representing anatomical societies from throughout the world. The First Federative International Congress of Anatomy met in Geneva in 1903.
BNA revisions	1933–1935	The BNA was adopted by anatomists from many countries including Spain and the United States, but the reception was far from universal.: French anatomists preferred to continue in their own tradition.; British anatomists broke away from the BNA in 1933, adopting the Birmingham Revision (BR).; The Anatomische Gesellschaft itself produced a revision in 1935, the Jena Nomina Anatomica (JNA) (or Ienaiensia Nomina Anatomica, INA). The JNA was notable for its adoption of a pronograde (horizontal) axis, which was well suited for the use of common anatomy for humans and other vertebrates.; The BNA and its various revisions (BR, JNA) remained standard international terminology until 1955.
Nomina Anatomica, 1st ed.	1955	The Fifth Congress (Oxford, 1950) established a committee, the International Anatomical Nomenclature Committee (IANC), to work on standardized anatomical terminology. The IANC's revision of the BNA was approved in 1955 at the Sixth Congress, meeting in Paris. It was originally called the Parisiensia Nomina Anatomica (PNA) but later became known simply as the Nomina Anatomica (NA). It contained 5,640 terms, of which 4,286 were unchanged from the BNA. The committee favored the BNA's orthograde (walking upright) orientation (anatomical position) over the JNA's pronograde (walking with body horizontal to the ground) orientation, which led to a schism between the committee and veterinary anatomists, and the subsequent publication of the Nomina Anatomica Veterinaria in 1968.
Nomina Anatomica, 2nd ed.	1961	Revisions of Nomina Anatomica were approved at the Seventh Congress (New York City, 1960)
Nomina Anatomica, 3rd ed.	1966	Approved at the Eighth Congress (Wiesbaden, 1965).
Nomina Anatomica, 4th ed.	1977	Approved at the Ninth Congress (Leningrad, 1970), the Tenth Congress (Tokyo, 1975). The fourth edition introduced the Nomina Histologica and Nomina Embryologica.
Nomina Anatomica, 5th ed.	1983	Approved at the Eleventh Congress (Mexico City, 1980).
Nomina Anatomica, 6th ed.	1989	Approved at the Twelfth Congress (London, 1985). Contains about 6,400 terms. The title of the sixth edition includes the phrase "authorised by the Twelfth International Congress of Anatomists in London, 1985", but this authorization is disputed.
Terminologia Anatomica, 1st ed.	1998	Approved at the Thirteenth Congress (Rio de Janeiro, 1989). Contains more than 9,200 terms.

== The IANC and the FCAT ==
=== Twelfth congress ===
Around the time of the Twelfth Congress (London, 1985), a dispute arose over the editorial independence of the IANC. The IANC did not believe that their work should be subject to the approval of IFAA Member Associations.

The types of discussion underlying this dispute are illustrated in an article by Roger Warwick, then Honorary Secretary of the IANC:

An aura of scholasticism, erudition and, unfortunately, pedantry has therefore often impeded attempts to rationalize and simplify anatomical nomenclature, and such obstruction still persists. The preservation of archaic terms such as Lien, Ventriculus, Epiplooon and Syndesmologia, in a world which uses and continues to use Splen, Gaster, Omentum and Arthrologia (and their numerous derivatives) provides an example of such pedantry.

We have inherited a number of archaic and now somewhat irrational terms which are confusing to the non-Latinistic students and scientists of today ... Knowledge of Latin is extremely limited today, and thus any Latin nomenclature must be simplified to the utmost to achieve maximum clarity, usefulness, and hence acceptance.

Unless anatomical nomenclature is subject to a most rigorous revision, in terms of simplification and rationalization, general use of such an internationally official nomenclature as Nomina Anatomica will decline rather than increase.

What declined, however, was the influence of the IANC on anatomical terminology. The IANC published a sixth edition of Nomina Anatomica, but it was never approved by the IFAA.

=== Thirteenth congress ===
Instead, at the Thirteenth Congress (Rio de Janeiro, 1989), the IFAA created a new committee – the Federative Committee on Anatomical Terminology (FCAT). The FCAT took over the task of revising international anatomical terminology. The result was the publication, in 1998, of a "new, updated, simplified and uniform anatomical terminology", the Terminologia Anatomica (TA) . The IANC was acknowledged in this work as follows:

Since the first meeting, the FCAT made several contacts with the IANC aiming at the natural transition from the old approach to the approach established by the General Assembly of the IFAA. Such initiatives, however, did not result in a modus vivendi for harmonious collaboration.

== Terminologia Anatomica (TA) ==
The Terminologia Anatomica is the joint creation of the FCAT (now FICAT—the Federative International Committee on Anatomical Terminology) and the Member Associations of the International Federation of Associations of Anatomists (IFAA). The first edition, published in 1998, supersedes all previous lists. It is the international standard for anatomical terminology.

The 39th edition of Gray's Anatomy (2005) explicitly recognizes Terminologia Anatomica.

== Modern use ==
NA and its derivatives are still used in some contexts (even the controversial sixth edition), and there remain some obstacles to universal adoption of TA:

- The TA is only available in Latin, English, and Spanish, while the NA is available in many additional languages, which has had an impact upon international adoption of TA.
- Terminologia Embryologica is under development, but is not yet available. By contrast, multiple editions of Nomina Embryologica were published.
- Nomina Histologica underwent several editions. Until recently, there was no Terminologia Histologica. However, an edition was published in 2008.
- There is no "Terminologia" equivalent to the Nomina Anatomica Veterinaria.

== See also ==
- Federative International Committee on Anatomical Terminology
- International Federation of Associations of Anatomists
- International Morphological Terminology
