= Henry John Klassen =

American physician-scientist

Henry John Klassen is an American physician-scientist in the field of regenerative ophthalmology, known for his research in stem cell treatments for retinal disorders, such as retinitis pigmentosa (RP).

== Early life and education ==
Klassen received a BA in neurobiology from the University of California at Berkeley. He earned his medical degree in 1991 and his PhD in neurobiology in 1998 from the University of Pittsburgh School of Medicine. He finished his internship at Cambridge Hospital (Massachusetts), then went on to an Ophthalmology residency at the Yale Eye Center. After that, he undertook a combined fellowship in London, which involved clinical training in medical retina with Professor Alan C. Bird at Moorfields Eye Hospital and research with Professor Raymond Lund at the Institute of Ophthalmology.

== Academic and professional career ==
After completing his fellowship, Klassen was a senior stem cell researcher at the Children's Hospital of Orange County, where he researched retina-derived stem cells. He then moved to the Singapore Eye Research Institute before joining the Department of Ophthalmology at the University of California, Irvine (UCI), where he works as a professor. He is also the director of the Stem Cell and Regeneration Program at UCI. On 2012, Klassen co-founded jCyte, a biotech firm focused on creating Stem-cell therapy for retinal disorders. As the company's president, he guides efforts to translate research from the lab to clinical applications.

=== Research focus ===
Klassen's lab focuses on the practical application of human retinal progenitor cells (hRPCs) as treatment options for degenerative retinal conditions, especially retinitis pigmentosa. His studies have demonstrated that the transplantation of retinal progenitor cells can enhance photoreceptor function in deteriorating retinas. The stem cell treatment jCell, created by jCyte, has received Orphan drug status from both the Food and Drug Administration (FDA) and the European Medicines Agency (EMA). This status allows the company to access several advantages, such as protections for intellectual property, tax benefits, and funding opportunities. Furthermore, jCell has been included in the Therapeutics for Rare and Neglected Diseases (TRND) program, which is affiliated with the National Center for Advancing Translational Sciences (NCATS) at the National Institutes of Health (NIH).

=== Academic distinctions ===
- Innovator Awards, Awarded Entrepreneurial Leader of the Year 2023

== Personal life ==
On 15 March 2024, Klassen converted to Islam, stating that the perseverance of the people of Gaza inspired his decision.

== See also ==
- Keith L. Moore
- Islam and science
- Religion and science
- Joel Hayward
