= British Association of Clinical Anatomists =

- Abbreviation: BACA
- Formation: 1977
- Type: Medical association
- Legal status: Charity
- Purpose: Clinical anatomy in the UK
- Region served: UK
- Affiliations: American Association of Clinical Anatomists
- Website: BACA

The British Association of Clinical Anatomists is a Registered Charitable Company in the United Kingdom, dedicated to advancing the study of, and research into clinical anatomy for the public benefit.

== History ==
The Association was founded on the 7th of July 1977, at a meeting convened in London, at the Royal College of Surgeons of England. R. E. Coupland was elected as President, R. M. H. McMinn appointed as Secretary, and D. Mayor as Treasurer.

== Function ==
The Association holds two professional meetings each year, dedicated to advancing the understanding of Clinical Anatomy. It hosts a series of online webinars (BACA Beats) at which presentations by experts in applied clinical anatomy will present reviews of the current topics in the subject. It also contributes editorial content to the journal Clinical Anatomy.

== Structure ==
The Society is a registered charitable company in the United Kingdom.
