= Nomina Anatomica Veterinaria =

Standard veterinary anatomical reference

The Nomina Anatomica Veterinaria (often abbreviated as NAV) is a standardized nomenclature. It is made by World Association of Veterinary Anatomists (WAVA). It is used as the standard reference for anatomical (zootomical) terminology in the field of veterinary science regarding domestic mammals (domestic birds are regarded in the Nomina Anatomica Avium). It is based on cats, dogs, pigs, cows, sheep, goats, rabbits and horses—horses being their main subjects.

== History ==
Veterinary anatomists split at the 6th International Congress of the International Anatomical Nomenclature Committee in Paris in 1955, due to disagreements about the Nomina Anatomica. Following Professor Clement Bressou in 1957 in Freiburg (Germany), they formed the International Committee on Veterinary Anatomical Nomenclature, which was renamed World Association of Veterinary Anatomists in 1961, and published the first edition of the Nomina Anatomica Veterinaria (NAV) in 1968. There have been six editions of the NAV, the latest being published in 2017. The fourth edition, published in 1994, was the last commercially printed edition; the fifth and sixth editions are available in PDF.

== See also ==
- Nomina Anatomica
