= Zvia Agur =

Israeli mathematical biologist

Zvia Agur (Hebrew: צביה עגור) is an Israeli mathematical biologist, the founding president of the Institute for Medical BioMathematics, the former chair and chief scientific officer of Optimata Ltd., and the founding president of the Israeli Society of Theoretical and Mathematical Biology. Her research has included mathematical modeling of the pulse vaccination strategy and of cancer growth.

== Education and career ==
Agur received a double Ph.D. in 1982, in zoology from the Hebrew University of Jerusalem and in chemical physics from the Université libre de Bruxelles.

She became a postdoctoral researcher and scientist in applied mathematics at the Weizmann Institute of Science from 1982 until 1994, when she moved to Tel Aviv University as an associate professor in the Department of Cell Research and Immunology. While continuing to work for Tel Aviv University, she founded the Institute for Medical BioMathematics in 1999. She left the university in 2000 to found Optimata Ltd., and served as its chair and chief scientific officer until 2020.

She became founding president of the Israeli Society of Theoretical and Mathematical Biology in 1998, and served as its president until 2002. She also served on the board of directors of the European Society of Mathematical and Theoretical Biology from 1997 to 2003.

== Recognition ==
Agur was named as a Fellow of the American Association for the Advancement of Science, in its 2022 class of fellows. She became the second Israeli woman named as a fellow of the AAAS, and the first Israeli in over ten years.
