= Federative International Programme on Anatomical Terminology =

Committee of anatomists

The Federative International Programme for Anatomical Terminology (FIPAT) is a group of experts who review, analyze, and discuss the terms of the morphological structures of the human body. It was created by the International Federation of Associations of Anatomists (IFAA) and was previously known as the Federative Committee on Anatomical Terminology (FCAT) and the Federative International Committee on Anatomical Terminology (FICAT).

== Origins and history ==
This committee was created in 1989, at the XIII International Congress of Anatomists, held in Rio de Janeiro (Brazil). It followed the old International Anatomical Nomenclature Committee (IANC).

The professionals involved are renowned professors and researchers with knowledge of medical terminology.

They hold periodic meetings in different countries on a rotating basis, where they study morphological terminology: anatomical, histological and embryology of the human being.

The results of this committee were published in 1998 in the anatomical area and in 2008 in the histological area. It is currently working in the embryologist area.

== Objectives and scope ==
The main objective is to study the problem of morphological terms and its possible solutions.

The aim is to achieve a common scientific language that allows international integration, facilitating scientific exchange and progress in the various medical specialties.

This impacts on research, teaching and medical care worldwide.

== See also ==
- International Morphological Terminology
- Terminologia Anatomica
- Nomina Anatomica
- Terminologia Histologica
- Terminologia Embryologica
