= Pan American Association of Anatomy =

Scientific organization

The Pan American Association of Anatomy (PAA) is a public, nonprofit, scientific organization that brings together professionals engaged in the study of Anatomy and related sciences in the American continent.

== Origins and objectives ==
The Pan American Association of Anatomy (PAA) was created in July 1966 in Mexico City at the 1st Pan American Congress of Anatomy, which was held together with the 3rd National Congress of the Mexican Society of Anatomy. Its mentor was the Prof. Dr. Liberato J. A. Didio.

The need for a Pan American Association of Anatomy was proposed by Prof. Di Dio during the 74th meeting of the American Association of Anatomy held in Chicago, USA, in March 1961.

Its objectives include stimulating the development and improvement of teaching and research of morphological sciences on the American continent, facilitating scientific exchange in all its aspects. Since then and through its meetings, it has spread and updated progress of morphological sciences on the American continent.

== Organizational structure ==
The PAA is a member of the International Federation of Associations of Anatomists (IFAA).

The government of the Pan American Association of Anatomy consists of the general assembly (performed with partners in the congress), the board of directors (composed by advisers or delegates from each country) and the executive committee (headed by the president, who is elected by the general assembly).

There are two counselors or delegates for each American country concerned; one as owner and another alternate.

When the mandate of the president of the executive committee is finished, he is named honorary president of the association and he automatically joins the Honorary Presidents Committee of the PAA, which works with the executive committee.

The headquarters of the congresses vary from one congress to another, but they are always within the Americas and in a rotative form. The designation of the host country is resolved at the general assembly by a vote of its partners and it is usually held every 3 years.

Since 2013, the association executive committee has been chaired by Prof. Dr. Manuel Arteaga Martínez, from Mexico (2013–2017). The next Pan-American Congress of Anatomy will be held in Peru, 2017; its president is Prof. Dr. Germán Molina Albornoz, from Peru.

The statutes of the association and the Pan American Congress of Anatomy, adopted by majority vote by the general assembly of the association, can be found on the.

== Pan American Congress ==
In 50 years of association life, 18 congresses have been held, with an interval of 3 years (sometimes 2 years) between them. The following countries have hosted at least one congress: Argentina, Brazil, Canada, Costa Rica, Chile, Mexico, Peru, Uruguay, USA and Venezuela.

The Congress covers various topics of morphological sciences and related sciences that have application to the biology and health sciences, especially in medicine and dentistry. It involves research, teaching and medical care. In particular, issues related to development anatomy (embryology), microscopic anatomy (histology and cytology), human anatomy, veterinary anatomy, comparative anatomy, neuroanatomy, neurobiology, radiological anatomy, clinical anatomy, anthropology, biophysics and biochemistry, etc. are discussed.

== Symposia Iberian-Latin-American ==
In 2009, during the 43rd anniversary of the Pan American Association of Anatomy, the 1st Iberian-Latin-American Terminology Symposium (SILAT) was held, with the purpose of disseminating the International Morphological Terminology. Educational institutions of medical and other health areas which spoke Spanish and Portuguese used it on a daily basis. Its mentor was Prof. Dr. Rolando Cruz Gutiérrez.

Up today, there have been sixteen symposia: four in Costa Rica, two in Brazil, three in Mexico, four in Chile, two in Peru and one in Nicaragua. In these symposia, participants are divided into groups to work with the anatomical, histological and embryological terminology from the Terminology Committee (FICAT) of the International Federation of Associations of Anatomists (IFAA). Meetings are held every day. The symposia also develops the presentation of free papers concerning different aspects and considerations of terminology.

These groups of experts review, analyse and discuss the morphological terms; possible errors and defects in the studied structures are also discussed. It was determined that the future meetings are planned in other countries (such as Honduras, Ecuador, Argentina, etc.).

== Official publications ==
The PAA has the support of various magazines, which are the official organ of publication, showing summaries of scientific congresses communications and other aspects. They are: International Journal of Morphology (Revista Internacional de Morfología), Brazilian Journal of Morphology Sciences, Venezuelan Magazine of Morphological Sciences and Medical Journal of Costa Rica and Central America.

== Pan American Congress list ==
Headquarters, dates and presidencies:

- I Congress - Mexico City, Mexico – 23–28 July 1966 - chaired by the Prof. Fernando Quiroz Pavia.
- II Congress - Caracas, Venezuela – 25–31 July 1969 - headed by the Professor Jesús Yerena.
- III Congress - New Orleans, U.S.A. – 28 March to 1 April 1972 - chaired by the Prof. Liberato J. A. Di Dio.
- IV Congress. - Montreal, Canada – 17–23 August 1975 - headed by the Professor Sergey Fedoroff.
- V Congress - São Paulo, Brazil – 2–7 July 1978 - chaired by Prof. Eros Ábranles Erhart.
- VI Congress - Buenos Aires, Argentina – 6–10 October 1981 - chaired by Prof. José Luis Martinez.
- VII Congress - Punta del Este, Uruguay – 28 October to 1 November 1984 - headed by the Professor Alfredo Ruiz Liard.
- VIII Congress - Santiago, Chile – 25–30 October 1987 - chaired by the Prof. Alberto Rodríguez Torres.
- IX Congress - Trujillo, Peru – 21–27 October 1990 - chaired by the Prof. Marco Aurelio of Iparraguirre.
- X Congress - San Jose, Costa Rica – 9–15 February 1992 - chaired by the Prof. Rolando Cruz Gutiérrez.
- XI Congress - Mérida, Venezuela – 8–17 October 1995 - chaired by the Prof. David José Loyo war.
- XII Congress - São Paulo, Brazil – 13–18 December 1998 - chaired by the Prof. José Carlos Prates.
- XIII Congress - New Orleans, U.S.A. – 3–6 September 2000 - headed by the Professor Robert D. Yates.
- XIV Congress - Rio de Janeiro, Brazil – 24–27 July 2002 - headed by the Professor Maurice Moscovici.
- XV Congress - Puerto Iguazú, Argentina / Foz do Iguaçu, Brazil – 24–28 October 2004 - chaired by the Prof. Ricardo Jorge Losardo.
- XVI Congress - San José, Costa Rica – 24–28 April 2007 - chaired by the Prof. Rolando Cruz Gutiérrez.
- XVII Congress - Temuco, Chile - 25–30 April 2010 - chaired by Prof. Mariano del Sol Calderón.
- XVIII Congress - Huatulco, México - 1–4 October 2013 - chaired by Prof. Manuel Arteaga Martínez.

== Iberian-Latin-American Symposia list ==
Headquarters, dates and presidencies:

- I Symposium - San José, Costa Rica – 13–16 April 2009 - chaired by Prof. Dr. Rolando Cruz Gutiérrez
- II Symposium - Lima, Perú – 15–18 September 2009 - chaired by Prof. Dr. Germán Molina Albornoz
- III Symposium - San José, Costa Rica – 26–30 April 2010 - chaired by Prof. Dr. Rolando Cruz Gutiérrez
- IV Symposium - São Paulo, Brazil - 3–7 October 2010 - chaired by Prof. Dra. Nadir Eunice Valverde Barbato de Prates.
- V Symposium - Temuco, Chile - 25–26 October 2010 - chaired by Prof. Dr. Alberto Rodríguez Torres.
- VI Symposium - Mexico D.F., Mexico - 13–16 April 2011 - chaired by Prof. Dr. Manuel Arteaga Martínez.
- VII Symposium - São Paulo, Brazil - 12–16 February 2012 - chaired by Prof. Dr. Richard Halti Cabral.
- VIII Symposium - San José, Costa Rica - 2–4 May 2012 - chaired by Prof. Dr. José Luis Quirós Alpizar.
- IX Symposium - Huatulco, México - 29–30 September 2013 - chaired by Prof. Dr. María Isabel García Peláez.
- X Symposium - Managua, Nicaragua - 16–18 July 2014 - chaired by Prof. Dr. Jamnyce Altamirano Carcache.
- XI Symposium - Temuco, Chile - 20–21 November 2014 - chaired by Prof. Dr. Mariano del Sol Calderón.
- XII Symposium - San José, Costa Rica - 25–28 August 2015 - chaired by Prof. Dr. Rolando Cruz Gutierrez.
- XIII Symposium - Valdivia, Chile - 11–12 November 2015 - chaired by Prof. Dr. Erik Gonzalo Trujillo.
- XIV Symposium - México DF, México - 28–30 July 2014 - chaired by Prof. Dr. Antonio Soto Paulino.
- XV Symposium - Lima, Perú - 8–9 March 2018 - chaired by Prof. Dr. Jorge Moscol Gonzales.
- XVI Symposium - Pucón, Chile - 4–5 October 2018 - chaired by Prof. Dr. Mariano del Sol.

== See also ==
- International Morphological Terminology
