= Clinical Anatomy =

- Discipline: Anatomy, physiology
- Language: English
- Edited by: R. Shane Tubbs

Publication details
- History: 1988–present
- Publisher: Wiley
- Frequency: 8/year
- Open access: Hybrid
- Impact factor: 2.3 (2024)

Standard abbreviations
- ISO 4: Clin. Anat.
- NLM: Clin Anat

Indexing
- CODEN: CLANE8
- ISSN: 0897-3806 (print); 1098-2353 (web)
- OCLC no.: 17469528

Links
- Journal homepage; Online access; Online archive

Clinical Anatomy is a peer-reviewed medical journal that covers human anatomy in all its aspects—gross, histologic, developmental, and neurologic—as applied to medical practice. It is the official publication of the American Association of Clinical Anatomists and the British Association of Clinical Anatomists and published on their behalf by Wiley.

According to the Journal Citation Reports, the journal has a 2024 impact factor of 2.3.
