= International Federation of Associations of Anatomists =

International scientific organization

The International Federation of Associations of Anatomists (IFAA) is an umbrella scientific organization of national and multinational Anatomy Associations, dedicated to anatomy and biomorphological sciences.

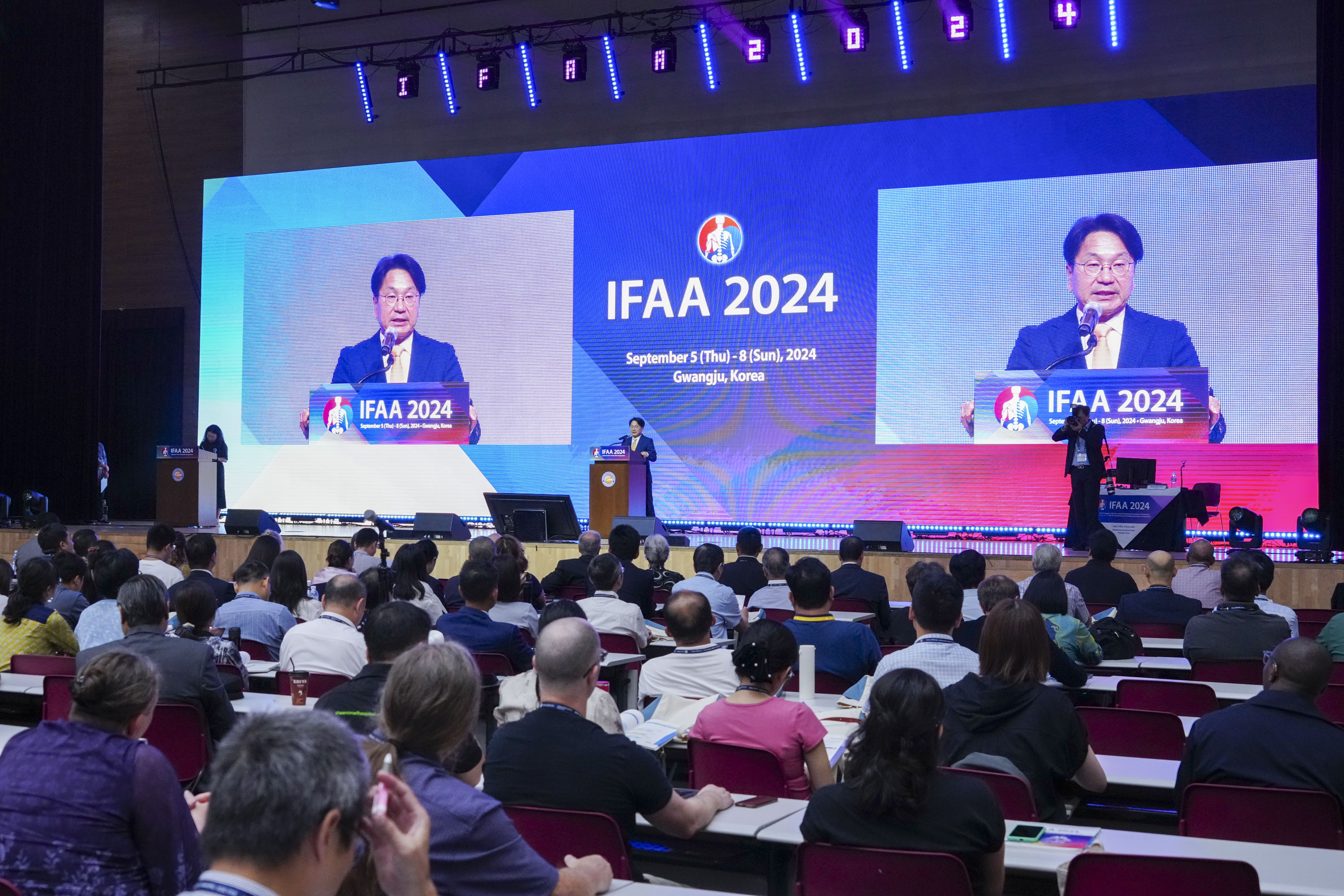
IFAA 2024 in Gwangju, South Korea

== Origins and objectives ==
In 1903, Prof. Nicolas, from Nancy, France, was successful in founding the International Federation of Associations of Anatomists.

The first International Congress of Anatomy was held in Geneva in 1905 and started as a committee to organize five yearly conferences.

There are 56 member associations of the International Federation of Associations of Anatomists (e.g., the American Association for Anatomy). The IFAA is the only international body representing all aspects of anatomy and anatomical associations.

Since 1989 the Federative International Committee on Anatomical Terminology (FICAT) under IFAA auspices, has met to analyze and study the international morphological terminology (Anatomy, Histology and Embryology), releasing updated Terminologia Anatomica in 1998 and Terminologia Histologica in 2008.

== Years, cities and presidencies ==
- I Congress - 1905 - Geneva, Switzerland - Prof. D' Eternod
- II Congress - 1910 - Brussels, Belgium - Prof. Waldeyer
- III Congress - 1930 - Amsterdam, the Netherlands - Prof. Van den Broek
- IV Congress - 1936 - Milan, Italy - Prof. Livini
- V Congress - 1950 - Oxford, England, The UK - Prof. Le Gros Clark
- VI Congress - 1955 - Paris, France - Prof. Collin
- VII Congress - 1960 - New York, USA - Prof. Bennett
- VIII Congress - 1965 - Weisbaden, Germany - Prof. Bargmann
- IX Congress - 1970 - Leningrad, Russia - Prof. Jdanov
- X Congress - 1975 - Tokyo, Japan - Prof. Nakayama
- XI Congress - 1980 - Mexico City, Mexico - Prof. Acosta Vidrio
- XII Congress - 1985 - London, The UK - Prof. Harrison
- XIII Congress - 1989 - Rio de Janeiro, Brazil - Prof. Moscovici
- XIV Congress - 1994 - Lisbon, Portugal - Prof. Esperança Pina
- XV Congress - 1999 - Rome, Italy
- XVI Congress - 2004 - Kyoto, Japan
- XVII Congress - 2009 - Cape Town, South Africa - Prof. Graham Louw
- XVIII Congress - 2014 - Beijing, PR China
- XIX Congress - 2019 - London, The UK - Prof. D. Ceri Davies
- XXI Congress - 2024 - Gwangju, Republic of Korea - Prof. Seung-Ho Han
- XXII Congress - 2026 - Melbourne, Australia - Profs. Nalini Pather & Quentin Fogg

== See also ==
- Nomina Anatomica
- Pan American Association of Anatomy
- Terminologia Anatomica
