= Anne Agur =

Canadian anatomist (1953–2026)

Anne Agur PhD, FAAA
- Born: Anne Maria Reet Vilde; November 10, 1953; Toronto, Canada
- Died: January 26, 2026 (aged 72); Toronto, Canada
- Education: University of Toronto (BSc in Occupational Therapy, MSc in Anatomy, PhD in Anatomy)
- Occupations: Teacher, researcher, textbook author
- Years active: 1978–2025
- Employer: University of Toronto
- Known for: Musculoskeletal system research, Anatomy education
- Notable work: Grant's Atlas of Anatomy, Essential Clinical Anatomy, Clinically Oriented Anatomy
- Spouse: Enno Agur
- Children: 2
- Awards: 2019 Henry Gray Distinguished Educator Award (AAA), 2018 Honored Member Award (AACA), 2013 Mel Silverman Mentorship Award (IMS)
- Honours: 2019 Fellow of the American Association of Anatomists (FAAA)
- Website: surgery.utoronto.ca/faculty/anne-agur

Anne Maria Reet Agur (née Vilde; November 10, 1953 – January 26, 2026) was a Canadian clinical anatomist who taught for many years in the Department of Anatomy within the Department of Surgery, at the University of Toronto. She was a full professor and received numerous awards for her teaching, research, and mentoring. She was a recipient of the Henry Gray Distinguished Educator Award (2019) from the American Association for Anatomy, which is the highest educational award for human anatomy education in the anatomical sciences. As of February 2026, her 157 publications have received 4,122 citations and contribute to an h-index score of 33.

Agur co-wrote several editions of medical textbooks Grant's Atlas of Anatomy, Essential Clinical Anatomy, and Clinically Oriented Anatomy.

== Early life and education ==
Anne Agur was born in Toronto, Canada on November 10, 1953. Her parents were Raimond and Valentina Vilde (née Kärner), who both emigrated from Estonia in 1944 to Sweden and later to Canada in 1950.

She attended Allenby Primary School, Glenview Senior Public School, and North Toronto Collegiate Institute.

Agur served as a leader and guide within the Rajaleidjad Girl Guide troop.

She earned her Bachelor of Science in Occupational Therapy in 1976. She then completed a Master of Science degree in 1978 under Dr. Ian Taylor and was appointed a lecturer at the University of Toronto. She completed a Doctor of Philosophy degree in 2001. Her thesis was titled "Architecture of the human soleus muscle: Three-dimensional computer modeling of cadaveric muscle and ultrasonographic documentation in vivo." and was completed under the mentorship of her research supervisor Dr. Nancy Hunt McKee.

== Research and career ==
Agur taught clinical anatomy, histology, neuroanatomy, and embryology at the University of Toronto for more than four decades.

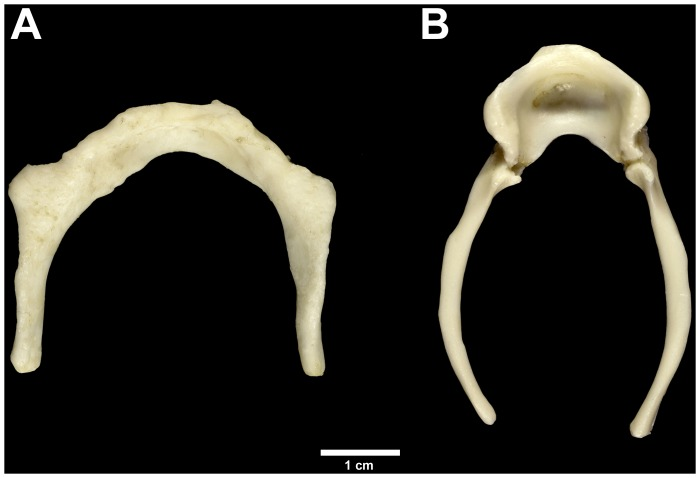
Hyoid bones of a male Homo sapiens (A) and Pan troglodytes (B), illustrating the absence of the prominent bulla in the human specimen that is characteristic of the chimpanzee hyoid.

Her primary research area was clinical application of normal and pathological structure and function of the musculoskeletal system. She was an expert in functional anatomy, arthrology, musculotendinous architecture, innervation patterns, and pain-generating mechanisms. She also contributed to research applying advanced imaging and biomechanical modeling to the Neanderthal hyoid bone.

Her primary faculty appointments at the University of Toronto were in the Division of Physical Medicine and Rehabilitation, Department of Occupational Science & Occupational Therapy, Department of Physical Therapy, Division of Biomedical Communications, and The Wilson Centre.

She also held graduate faculty appointments in the Institute of Medical Science, Graduate Department Rehabilitation Sciences, and Graduate Department of Dentistry.

Agur co-authored Grant's Atlas of Anatomy (with Arthur F. Dalley) from the 9th to 16th editions (1991-2024), during which time was added to Doody's Core Titles in Health Sciences list (formerly Brandon–Hill list).

She served as the president of the American Association of Clinical Anatomists from 2011-2013.

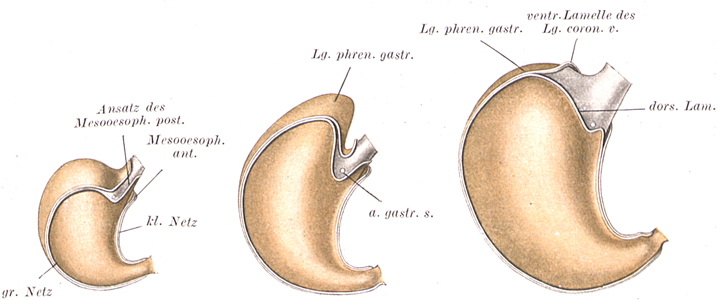
Illustration from Die Entwicklung der Form des Magendarmkanals beim Menschen (1923) by Eduard Pernkopf, an example of the detailed anatomical artwork later analyzed by Agur in her scholarship on the clinical relevance and ethical context of the Pernkopf Atlas.

Her research also addressed bioethical issues in anatomy education. In a 2022 article, she examined the clinical use of the detailed illustrations in the Pernkopf Atlas for guiding nerve ablation. She emphasized the importance of openly acknowledging the altas's controversial historical origins.

Agur retired on June 30, 2025 and was conferred as Professor Emerita.

She was a member of the Estonian women's student corporation Filiae Patriae.

== Personal life and death ==
Agur met Enno Eric Agur in July 1970, they were married on January 15, 1977, and they had two children. She was an active member of the Estonian community of Toronto, including involvement with Girl Guides, the Estonian Studies Centre in Canada, Estonian Museum Canada, Tartu College, and Toronto Friends of Scouting Society.

Agur died in Toronto on January 26, 2026, at the age of 72. She succumbed to cancer 30 months after diagnosis. Her memorial service was scheduled for March 18, at Trinity-St. Paul's United Church in Toronto.

== Awards and honours ==
Throughout her career, Agur received numerous awards recognizing her impact on anatomy education, clinical scholarship, and mentorship.

In 2014, she earned the Excellence in Undergraduate Life Sciences Teaching Award for sustained excellence in integrating research into undergraduate teaching within basic science departments in a faculty of medicine. That year, she also received the Longstanding Academic Contribution and Collaboration from an External Partner Award from the Division of Physiatry at the University of Toronto, honoring her ongoing scholarly and collaborative contributions.

Her commitment to professional education was further acknowledged in 2016 with a Teaching Excellence Award from the Canadian Association of Physical Medicine and Rehabilitation. The award, presented on behalf of residents in a national review course, recognized her outstanding teaching. In the same period, she and the anatomy laboratory team she directed were recognized with a Department of Physical Therapy Team Recognition Award for their contribution to physical therapy education.

Agur's international reputation was reflected in her election as an Honorary Member of the Argentine Association of Clinical Anatomy in 2015. In 2018, she was named an Honored Member of the American Association of Clinical Anatomists for her distinguished career in clinically applied anatomy, scholarship, and mentorship.

In 2019, she was elected a Fellow of the American Association for Anatomy, a distinction limited to a small proportion of members. That same year, she received the Henry Gray Distinguished Educator Award, the association's highest honor for excellence in human anatomy education. In 2025, she was recognized with the Outstanding Mentor Award from the same organization.

== Legacy ==
Agur mentored generations of students and educators, many of which have received awards:

- Daryn Bikey: 2015 Outstanding Poster Presentation Award
- Shannon Roberts: 2015 Sandy R. Marks Student Poster Presentation Award – Basic Science
- Shannon Roberts: 2016 First Place Original Research Award
- Allen Duong: 2017 Ralph Ger Student Platform Presentation Award
- Mikaela Stiver: 2018 Sandy R. Marks Student Poster Presentation Award – Basic Science
- John Tran: 2018 Ralph Ger Student Platform Presentation Award
- John Tran: 2019 Ralph Ger Student Platform Presentation Award
- Mai-Lan Johnston: 2019 Sandy R. Marks Student Poster Presentation Award – Basic Science
- Mikaela Stiver: 2019 Early Career Travel Award
- Valera Castanov: 2019 Early Career Travel Award

== Publications ==
Agur was an author. She has authored or co-authored >150 peer reviewed scientific articles, which have received >4,100 citations, and contribute to an h-index of 33. Her published books include:

- Agur, Anne M. R.; Dalley, Arthur F. (29 January 2024). Grant's Atlas of Anatomy. Lippincott Williams & Wilkins. ISBN 978-1-9752-8311-7.
- Agur, Anne M. R.; Dalley, Arthur F. (6 January 2023). Moore's Essential Clinical Anatomy. Lippincott Williams & Wilkins. ISBN 978-1-9752-8368-1.
- II, Arthur F. Dalley; Agur, Anne M. R. (7 December 2021). Moore's Clinically Oriented Anatomy. Lippincott Williams & Wilkins. ISBN 978-1-9751-5408-0.
- Agur, Anne (2021). "Anatomical Detail and Accuracy of the Pernkopf Atlas and Examples of Clinical Impact". The Journal of Biocommunication. 45 (1): E14. doi:10.5210/jbc.v45i1.10850. ISSN 0094-2499. PMC 9139409. PMID 36407923.
