= American Association of Clinical Anatomists =

== About ==
The American Association of Clinical Anatomists (AACA) aims to advance the science and art of clinical anatomy. It encourages research and publication in the field and maintains high standards in the teaching of anatomy. Clinical anatomy is defined as anatomy in all its aspects - gross, histologic, developmental and neurologic as applied to clinical practice, the application of anatomic principles to the solution of clinical problems and/or the application of clinical observations to expand anatomic knowledge.

The AACA is a member of the International Federation of Associations of Anatomists (IFAA). The AACA's official journal, Clinical Anatomy, is also the official journal of the British Association of Clinical Anatomists. It publishes original and review articles of scientific, clinical, and educational interest to anatomists and clinicians.

Typical membership, regular or associate (student/intern) in the Association comprises individuals from various backgrounds who have produced a record of research, clinical practice, clinical research, teaching in accredited colleges and universities, administrative or other experience in the field. Many of the primary educators of medical students in their first year of medical school are AACA members. The current president of the AACA is Oliver H. Beahrs, M.D.

== Committees ==
- Anatomical Services Committee
- Bylaws Committee
- Career Development Committee
- Clinical Anatomical Terminology Committee
- Educational Affairs Committee
- Financial Affairs Committee
- Journal Committee
- Membership Committee
- Nominating Committee
- Program and Meeting Committees

== Past Presidents ==
- 2021-2023 Thomas Gest, Ph.D.
- 2019-2021 Robert J. Spinner, M.D.
- 2017-2019 Marios Loukas, M.D., Ph.D.
- 2015-2017 Neil S. Norton, Ph.D.
- 2013-2015 Brian R. MacPherson, Ph.D.
- 2011-2013 Anne R. Agur, Ph.D.
- 2009-2011 Todd R. Olson, Ph.D.
- 2007-2009 Lawrence M. Ross, M.D., Ph.D.
- 2005-2007 Thomas Quinn, Ph.D.
- 2003-2005 Carol Scott-Conner, M.D., Ph.D.
- 2001-2003 Daniel O. Graney, Ph.D.
- 1999-2001 R. Benton Adkins, Jr., M.D.
- 1997-1999 Arthur F. Dalley, II, Ph.D.
- 1995-1997 Peter C. Amadio, M.D.
- 1993-1995 Donald R. Cahill, Ph.D.
- 1991-1993 Sandy C. Marks, Jr. D.D.S., Ph.D.
- 1989-1991 Keith L. Moore, Ph.D.
- 1987-1989 Robert A. Chase, M.D.
- 1985-1987 Ralph Ger, M.D.
- 1983-1985 Oliver H. Beahrs, M.D.
