= National Association for the Dually Diagnosed =

Advocacy organization

The National Association for the Dually Diagnosed (NADD) is a non-profit membership organisation founded in 1983 by Dr Robert Fletcher. It provided services and advocation for people who have a dual diagnosis of mental health disorders and developmental disabilities.

Among other publications, the NADD produces the Diagnostic Manual for Intellectual Disability, which has become an important resource for mental health clinicians. It also hosts an annual international congress on dual diagnosis.
