= Medical terminology =

Language used to describe the human body

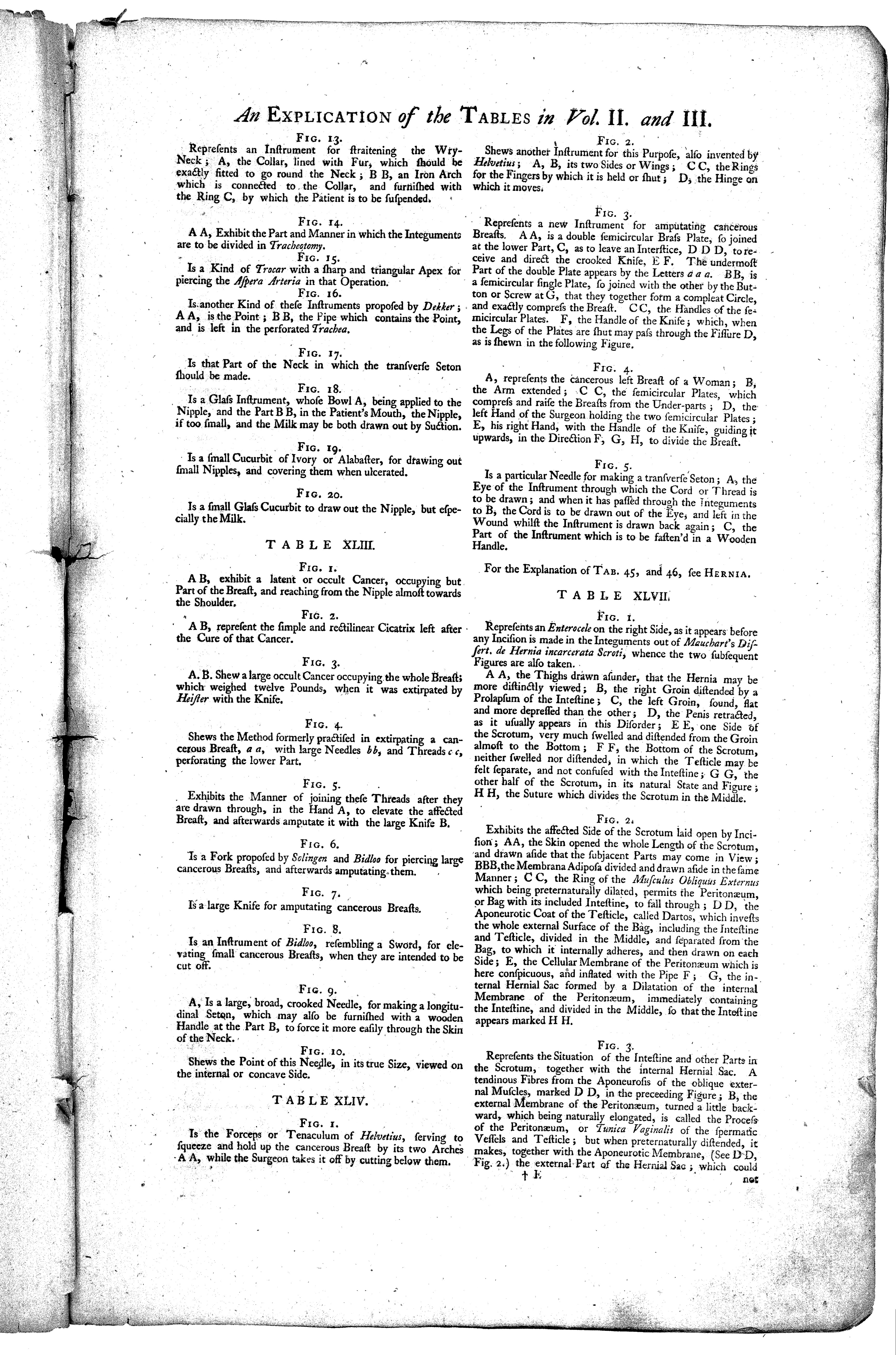

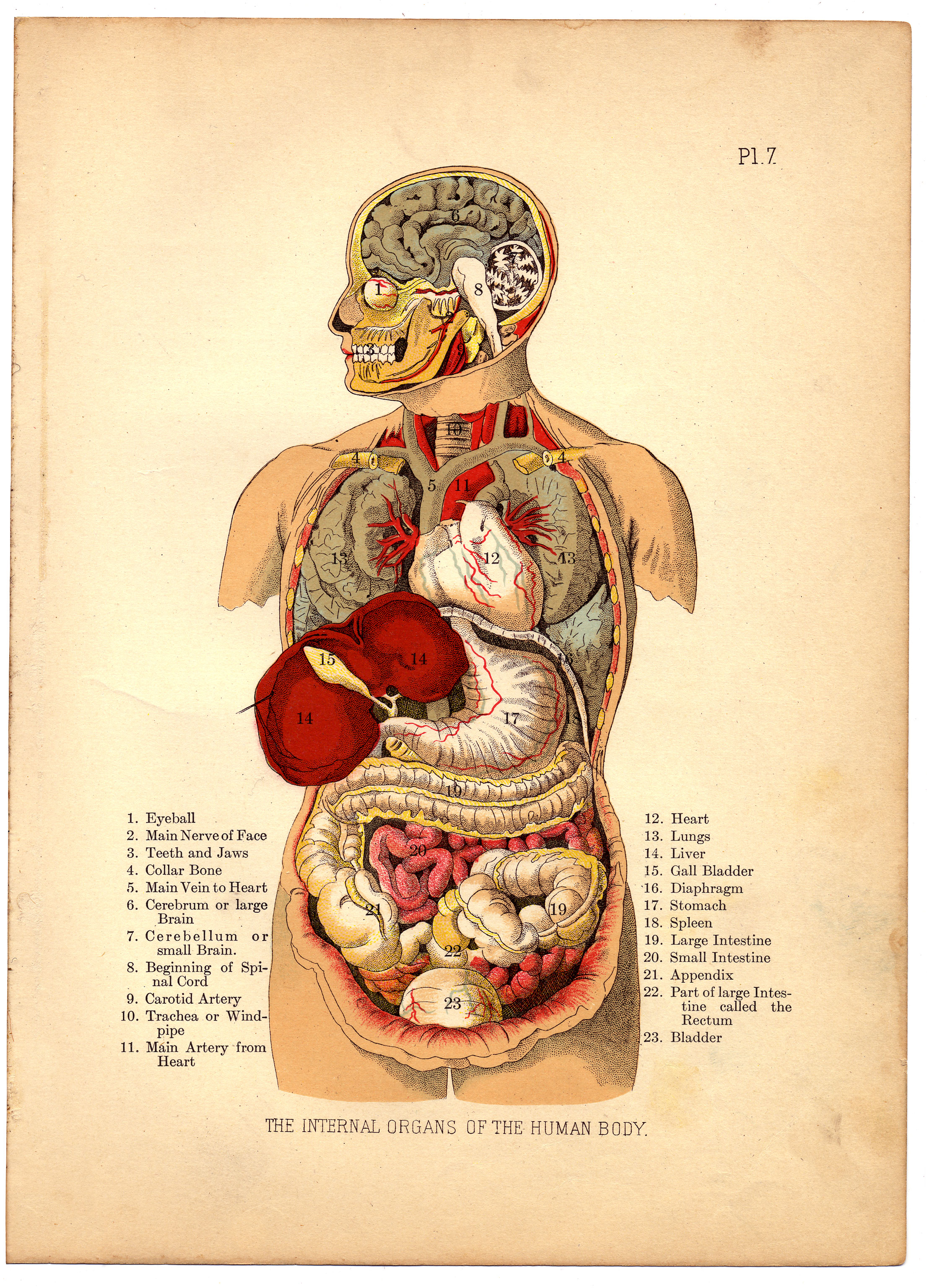

Details
- Part of: Scientific terminology

Medical terminology is language used to describe the components, processes, conditions, medical procedures and treatments of the human body.

In the English language, medical terminology generally has a regular morphology; the same prefixes and suffixes are used to add meanings to different roots. The root of a term often refers to an organ, tissue, or condition, and medical roots and affixes are often derived from Ancient Greek or Latin (particularly Neo-Latin). Many medical terms are examples of neoclassical compounds. Historically, all European universities used Latin as the dominant language of instruction and research, as Neo-Latin was the lingua franca of science, medicine, and education in Europe during the early modern period.

Medical terminology includes a large part of anatomical terminology, which includes the anatomical terms of location, motion, muscle, bone, and histology. It also includes language from biology, chemistry, physics, and physiology, as well as vocabulary unique to the field of medicine, such as medical abbreviations. Each branch of medicine has its own clinical and scientific terminology. Medical dictionaries are specialised dictionaries for medical terminology and may be organised alphabetically or according to medical classification systems such as the Systematized Nomenclature of Medicine, International Classification of Diseases, or Unified Medical Language System.

Examples of modern medical dictionaries include Mosby's Dictionary of Medicine, Nursing & Health Professions, Stedman's, Taber's, and Dorland's.

== Linguistics ==
In the English language, medical terms generally have a regular morphology, often being compound words that comprise three kinds of morphemes: roots, prefixes, and suffixes. The etymology of medical terms often originates from Latin (particularly Neo-Latin) and Ancient Greek, with such medical terms being examples of neoclassical compounds. Each language may supply relevant morphemes for medical terms. For example, there are two primary roots for medical terminology relating to kidneys – one from Greek (νεφρός nephr(os)) and one from Latin (ren(es)).

Lexical items of medical terminology, which forms part of international scientific vocabulary (ISV), are translingual (that is, being used across multiple languages). The use of ISV was a driving force in the development of the constructed language known as Interlingua. From the 1950s to late 1970s, a number of medical journals were published, or used, Interlingua.

=== Morphology ===
Medical roots and affixes are often derived from Greek or Latin.

==== Roots ====
The word root is developed to include a vowel sound following the term to add a smoothing action to the sound of the word when applying a suffix. The result is the formation of a new term with a vowel attached (word root + vowel) called a combining form. In English, the most common vowel used in the formation of the combining form is the letter -o-, added to the word root. For example, if there is an inflammation of the stomach and intestines, this would be written as gastro- and enter- plus -itis, gastroenteritis.

The formation of plurals should usually be done using the rules of the source language. Greek and Latin each have differing rules to be applied when forming the plural form of the word root.

==== Affixes ====
Prefixes and suffixes, primarily in Greek—but also in Latin, have a droppable -o-. As a general rule, this vowel almost always acts as a joint-stem to connect two consonantal roots (e.g. arthr- + -o- + -logy = arthrology), but generally, the -o- is dropped when connecting to a vowel-stem (e.g. arthr- + -itis = arthritis, instead of arthr-o-itis). Generally, Greek prefixes go with Greek suffixes and Latin prefixes with Latin suffixes. Although it is technically considered acceptable to create hybrid words, it is strongly preferred in coining new terms not to mix different lingual roots. Examples of accepted medical words that do mix lingual roots are neonatology and quadriplegia.

Prefixes do not normally require further modification to be added to a word root because the prefix normally ends in a vowel or vowel sound, although in some cases they may assimilate slightly and an in- may change to im- or syn- to sym-. Suffixes are attached to the end of a word root to add meaning such as condition, disease process, or procedure. Suffixes are categorized as either (1) needing the combining form, or (2) not needing the combining form since they start with a vowel.

== Gross anatomy ==
Descriptive human anatomy often uses terminology that is fairly correct descriptive Latin. For example, musculus gluteus maximus simply means the "largest rump muscle", where musculus was Latin for "little mouse" and applied to muscles; a frenum, a structure for keeping something in place, is Latin for bridle; and a foramen is Latin for a passage or perforation.

=== Location and motion ===
A standardised set of terminology is used in anatomy to describe relative and absolute location and movement of anatomical parts. The standard anatomical position is the orientation that anatomical terms of location and motion are typically used in reference to. In humans, this refers to the body in a standing position with arms at the side and palms facing forward. Other positions referenced in medicine include prone (lying facing down) and supine (lying facing up).

==== Planes and axes ====
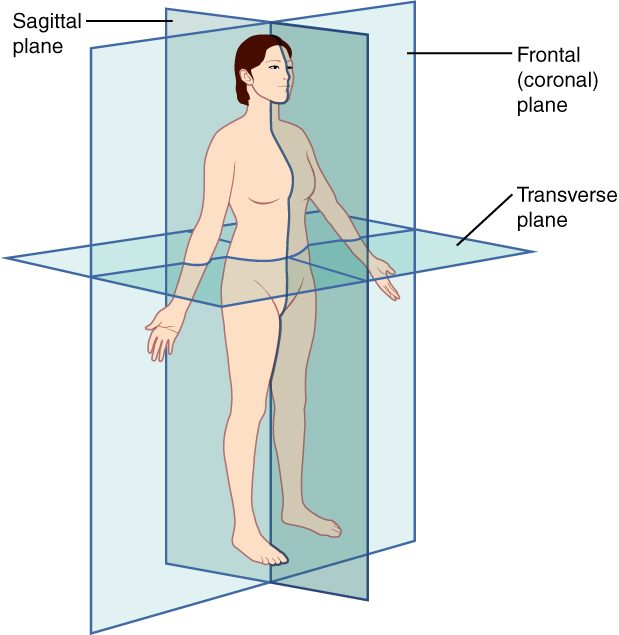
The three anatomical planes of the body: the sagittal, transverse (or horizontal), frontal planes

Relative to the standard anatomical position, three anatomical planes are widely used in medicine:

- The parasagittal (Greek πᾰρᾰ́ (pará), beside) or paramedian or sagittal planes (Latin sagitta, arrow), which include the median or midsagittal plane and divide the body into left and right (in reference to the subject and not the observer).
- The frontal or coronal plane (Latin corona, crown), which divide the body into front and back.
- The axial or horizontal or transverse plane (Latin trans, across; vetere, to turn), which is perpendicular to the other two planes.

The transpyloric plane, the subcostal plane, and the transumbilical plane planes are also considered in the division of the torso into the quadrants and regions of the abdomen.

The three main axes of a human are the left-right (or horizontal or frontal), the craniocaudal (or rostrocaudal, longitudinal, or cephalocaudal), (Note: Latin: wikt:cauda meaning 'tail') and the anteroposterior (or dorsoventral or sagittal) axes. (Note: Latin: wikt:dorsum meaning 'back', wikt:venter meaning 'belly') Other anatomical lines include the axillary lines, parasternal line, and scapular line.

==== Location ====
Anatomical terms of location
| Terms | Location | Definition | Etymology | Related terms | Ref |
|---|---|---|---|---|---|
| Afferent and efferent | Afferent | Conducting towards something | | Afferent nerve | |
| Afferent and efferent | Efferent | Conducting away from something | | Efferent nerve | |
| Anterior, posterior, superior, and inferior | Anterior | Front | Latin āntē, before, in front of | | |
| Anterior, posterior, superior, and inferior | Posterior | Back | Latin post, after, behind | | |
| Anterior, posterior, superior, and inferior | Superior | Above | Latin super, above, excessive | Superior vena cava, supraorbital vein | |
| Anterior, posterior, superior, and inferior | Inferior | Below | | | |
| Proximal and distal | Proximal | Closer to the trunk | | | |
| Proximal and distal | Distal | Farther from the trunk | | | |
| Medial and lateral | Medial | Closer to the midline | | | |
| Medial and lateral | Lateral | Farther from the midline | Latin laterālis, lateral, of or belonging to the side | Lateral pectoral nerve | |
| Superficial and deep | Superficial | Closer to the surface | | | |
| Superficial and deep | Deep | Farther from the surface | | | |
| Dorsal and ventral | Dorsal | Back (used mainly in neuroanatomy, embryology, and veterinary anatomy) | Latin dorsum, back | | |
| Dorsal and ventral | Ventral | Front (used mainly in neuroanatomy, embryology, and veterinary anatomy) | | | |
| Radial and ulnar | Radial | Closer to the midline, used only for structures at or distal to the elbow | | | |
| Radial and ulnar | Ulnar | Farther from the midline, used only for structures at or distal to the elbow | | | |
| Anteversion and retroversion | Anteversion | Titled further forward than normal, whether pathologically or incidentally. | Latin versiō, turning | Pelvic anteversion | |
| Anteversion and retroversion | Retroversion | Tilted back away from something. | Latin retro, backward, behind | Retroverted uterus | |

Many anatomical terms can be combined to indicate a position in two axes simultaneously or the direction of a movement relative to the body: Anterolateral indicates a position that is both anterior and lateral to the standard anatomical position (such as the bulk of the pectoralis major muscle) or a named organ such as the anterolateral tibial tubercle; anteromedial is used, for example, in the anteromedial central arteries; proximodistal describes the axis of an appendage such as an arm or a leg, taken from its tip at the distal part to where it joins the body at the proximal part. Combined terms were once generally hyphenated, but typically the hyphen is omitted.

In radiology, various X-ray views use terminology based on where the X-ray beam enters and leaves the body, including the front to back view (anteroposterior), the back to front view (posteroanterior), and the side view (lateral).

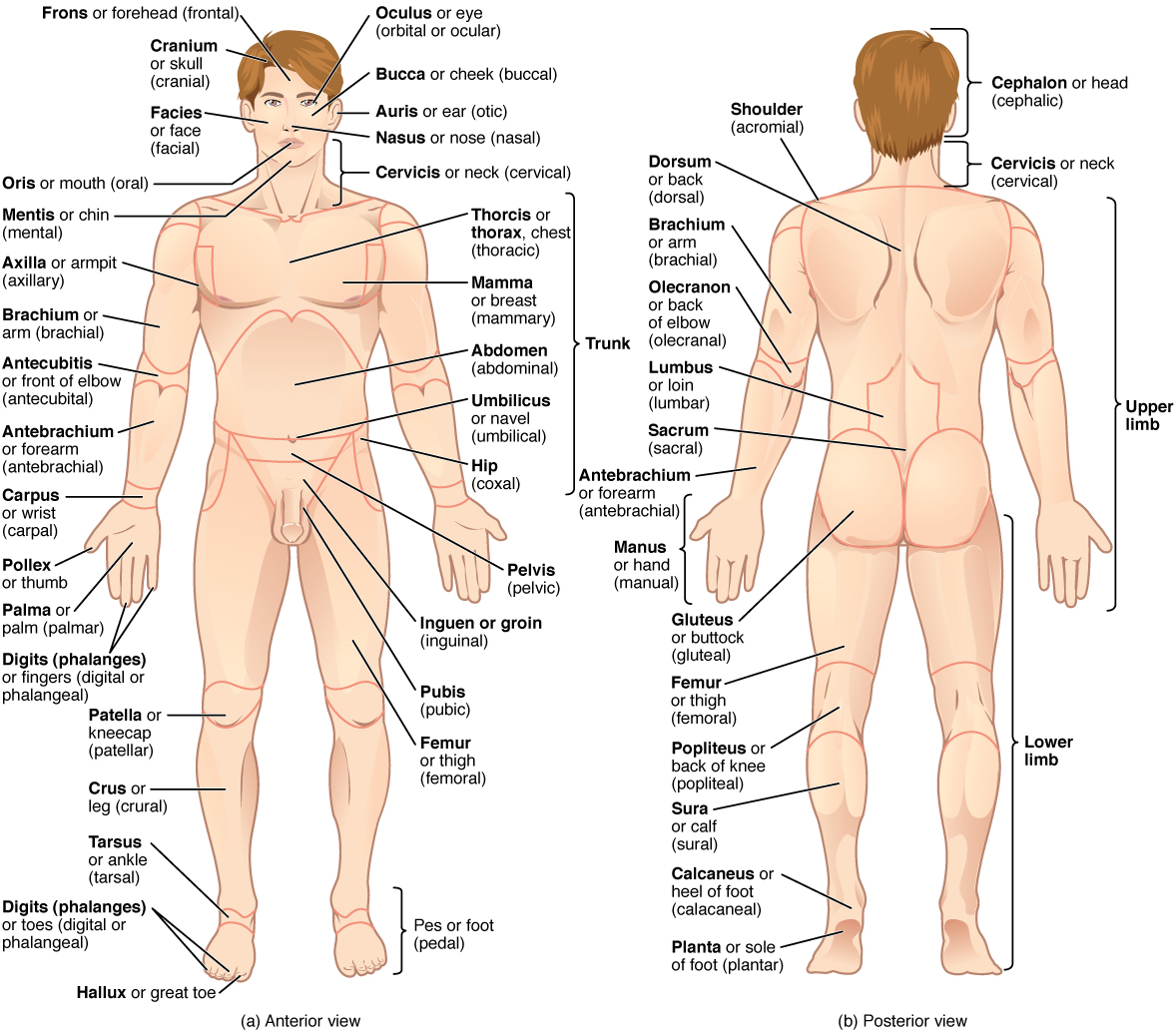
The human body is shown in anatomical position in an anterior view and a posterior view. The regions of the body are labeled in boldface.

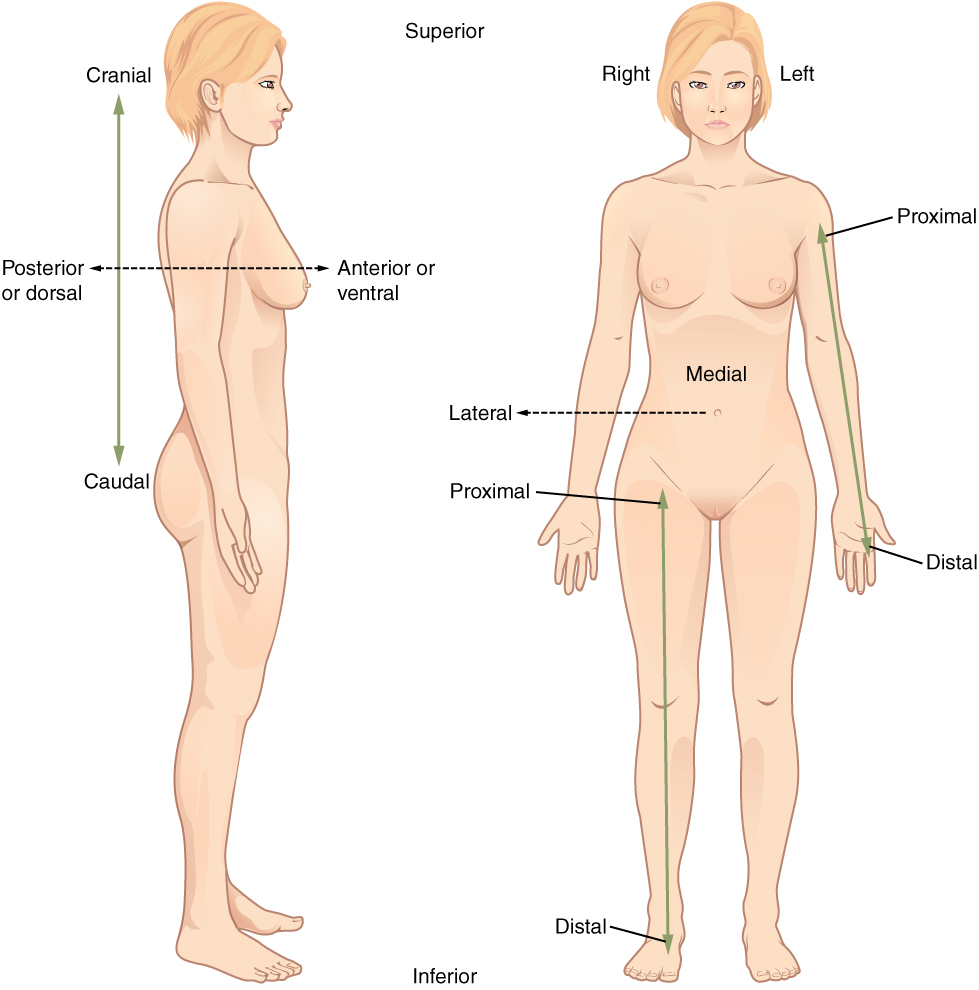
The anatomical position, with terms of relative location noted

==== Motion ====
Terms of general motion
| Terms | Movement | Definition | Etymology | Related terms | Ref |
|---|---|---|---|---|---|
| Abduction and adduction | Abduction | Pulls a structure away from a sagittal plane, carried out by one or more abductor muscles. | Latin ab, 'away'; ducere, 'to draw or pull'. Latin: adductere "to bring in" | Abdomen | |
| Abduction and adduction | Adduction | Pulls a structure towards a sagittal plane, carried out by one or more adductor muscles. | Latin ad, 'toward' Latin: abducere "to lead away" | | |
| Elevation and depression | Elevation | Pulls a structure in a direction superior to a horizontal plane, carried out by elevator muscles. | Latin: elevare, "to raise" | | |
| Elevation and depression | Depression | Pulls a structure in a direction inferior to a horizontal plane, carried out by depressor muscles. | Latin: deprimere, "press down" | | |
| Flexion and extension | Flexion | Decreases the angle between two parts of the body, carried out by flexor muscles. | Latin: flectere, "to bend" | | |
| Flexion and extension | Extension | Increases the angle between two parts of the body, carried out by extensor muscles. | Latin ex-, out of, away from, to remove Latin: extendere, "to stretch out" | | |
| Rotation | Internal rotation | Medial rotation, carried out by internal rotators. | | | |
| Rotation | External rotation | Lateral rotation, carried out by external rotators. | | | |

Circumduction is a conical movement of a body part, such as a ball and socket joint or the eye. Circumduction is a combination of flexion, extension, adduction and abduction. Circumduction may be performed at ball and socket joints, such as the hip and shoulder, as well as other parts of the body such as fingers, hands, feet, and head. For example, circumduction occurs when spinning the arm when performing a serve in tennis or bowling a cricket ball.

Terms of special motion
| Anatomical region | Movement | Definition | Etymology | Related terms | Source |
|---|---|---|---|---|---|
| Carpal (wrist) | Palmarflexion | Flexion of the wrist joint, towards the palm and ventral side of forearm. (In anatomical position, the front and back of the arm are, respectively, considered ventral and dorsal.) | Latin carpus Greek καρπός (karpós), wrist | | |
| Carpal (wrist) | Dorsiflexion | Extension of the wrist joint, towards the dorsal side of forearm. | | | |
| Carpal (wrist) | Radial deviation | Adduction of the wrist, which moves the hand towards the ulnar styloid, or, towards the little finger. | | | |
| Carpal (wrist) | Ulnar deviation | Abduction of the wrist, which moves the hand towards the radial styloid, or, towards the thumb. | | | |
| Plantar (sole)/pedal (foot) | Plantarflexion | Flexion in the direction of the sole. | | | |
| Plantar (sole)/pedal (foot) | Dorsiflexion | Flexion in the direction of the back of the foot. (The direction of terms are opposite to those in the hand because of embryological rotation of the limbs in opposite directions.) | | | |
| Plantar (sole)/pedal (foot) | Inversion | Rotation that tilts the sole of the foot away from the midline. | | Sprained ankle | |
| Plantar (sole)/pedal (foot) | Eversion | Rotation that tilts the sole of the foot towards the midline. | | | |
| Upper/lower limbs | Pronation | Rotation of an appendage (e.g. foot) so that the corresponding extremity (e.g. sole) is facing anteriorly. | Greek πρό- (pró-), before, in front of | Pronation of the foot | |
| Upper/lower limbs | Supination | Rotation of an appendage (e.g. forearm) so that the corresponding extremity (e.g. palm) is facing posteriorly. | | | |
| Sacral (end of spine) | Nutation | Rotation of promontory downwards and anteriorly, as with lumbar extension. | Latin lumbus or lumbaris, loin | Lumbar | |
| Sacral (end of spine) | Counternutation | Rotation of promontory upwards and posteriorly, as with lumbar flexion. | | | |

=== Integumentary ===
The integumentary system is the set of organs forming the outermost layer of the human body, comprising the skin, hair, and nails. It acts as a protective physical barrier between the external environment and the internal environment, while maintaining water balance, protecting deeper tissue, excreting waste, and regulating body temperature.

The skin (or, integument) is a composite organ, made up of the outermost epidermis and the inner dermis. The epidermis comprises five layers: the stratum corneum, stratum granulosum, stratum spinosum and stratum basale. Where the skin is thicker, such as in the palms and soles, there is an extra layer of skin between the stratum corneum and the stratum granulosum known as the stratum lucidum. The dermis comprises two sections, the papillary and reticular layers, and contains connective tissues, blood vessels, glands, follicles, hair roots, sensory nerve endings, and muscular tissue. Between the integument and the deep body musculature there is a transitional subcutaneous zone, the hypodermis.

=== Musculoskeletal ===
Front and back views of the major skeletal muscles of the human body

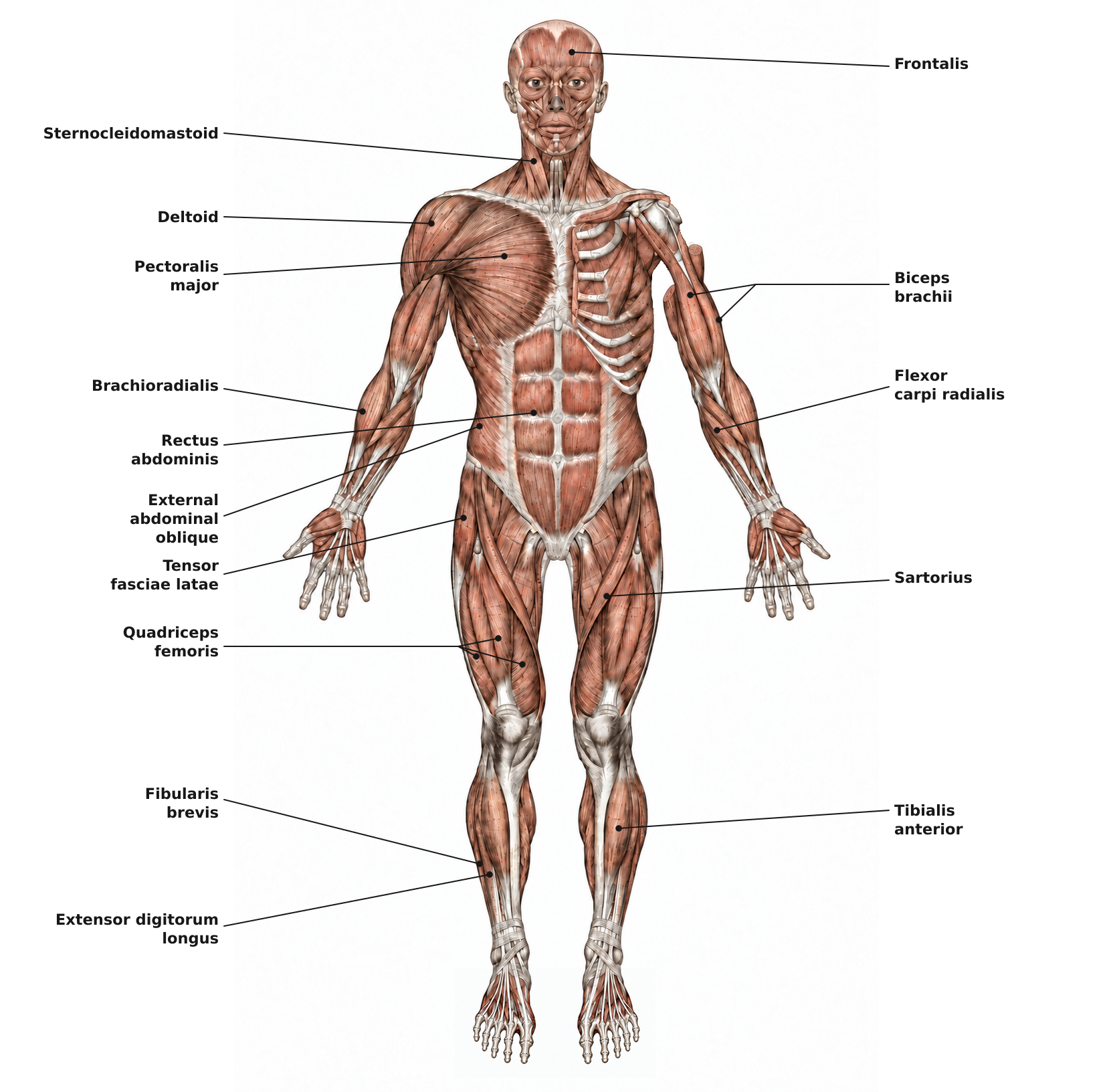
Front view of major skeletal muscles

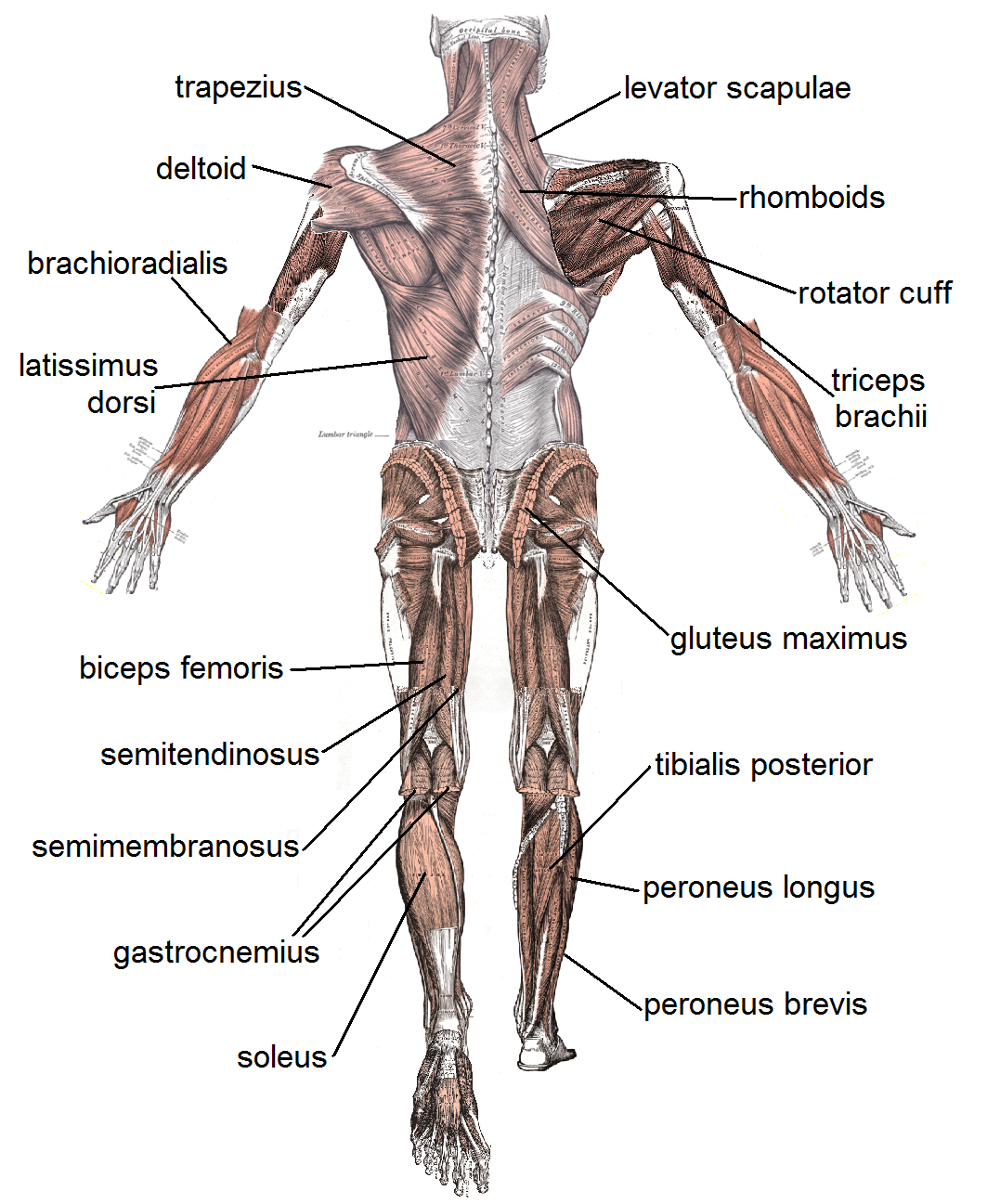
Back view of major skeletal muscles

The musculoskeletal system the organ system that gives humans the ability to move using their muscular and skeletal systems, and is described by the anatomical terms of bone and muscle. It is made up of the bones of the skeleton, muscles, cartilage, tendons, ligaments, joints, and other connective tissue that supports and binds tissues and organs together:

- Bones are surrounded by a membrane known as the periosteum (Greek περῐ́ (perí), around; Greek ὀστέον (ostéon), bone), and comprise multiple layers, depending on the type of bone, including yellow and red bone marrow, spongy bone, and the endosteum. There are five general classifications of bones:
  - Long bones are characterized by a shaft known as the diaphysis, which is much longer than its width, and an epiphysis (Greek ἐπι- (epi-) upon, outside, over), a rounded head at each end of the shaft, connected to the diaphysis by the epiphyseal plate. They are made up mostly of compact bone, with lesser amounts of marrow, located within the medullary cavity, and areas of spongy, cancellous bone at the ends of the bones.
  - Short bones are roughly cube-shaped, and have only a thin layer of compact bone surrounding a spongy interior. Short bones provide stability and support as well as some limited motion.
  - Flat bones are thin and generally curved, with two parallel layers of compact bone sandwiching a layer of spongy bone.
  - Sesamoid bones are bones embedded in tendons. Since they act to hold the tendon further away from the joint, the angle of the tendon is increased and thus the leverage of the muscle is increased.
  - Irregular bones do not fit into the above categories. They consist of thin layers of compact bone surrounding a spongy interior. As implied by the name, their shapes are irregular and complicated. Often this irregular shape is due to their many centers of ossification or because they contain bony sinuses.
- A tendon is a tough, flexible band of fibrous connective tissue that connects muscles to bones. The extra-cellular connective tissue between muscle fibers binds to tendons at the distal and proximal ends, and the tendon binds to the periosteum of individual bones at the muscle's origin and insertion. As muscles contract, tendons transmit the forces to the relatively rigid bones, pulling on them and causing movement. Tendons can stretch substantially, allowing them to function as springs during movement.
- Cartilage is a resilient and smooth type of connective tissue that covers and protects the ends of long bones, and forms a structural component of many body parts including the rib cage, the neck and the bronchial tubes, and the intervertebral discs. It is classified into three types — elastic cartilage, hyaline cartilage, and fibrocartilage.
- Joints, also known as articulations, are structures that connect individual bones and may allow bones to move against each other to cause movement. Joints can be classified by structure and by function. Structurally, synovial joints are joints that are not directly joined, which are lubricated by a solution called synovial fluid; fibrous, bony, and cartilaginous joints are characterised by the presence of their respective connective tissues. There are three functional divisions of joints:
  - Diarthroses, which allow extensive mobility between two or more articular heads.
  - Amphiarthroses, which allow some movement.
  - False joints or synarthroses, which allow little or no movement and are predominantly fibrous.
- A ligament is a small band of dense, white, fibrous elastic tissue. Ligaments connect the ends of bones together in order to form a joint. Most ligaments limit dislocation, and prevent certain movements, such as hyperextension and hyperflexion, which may lead to breaks.
- An enthesis is the connective tissue that attaches tendons and ligaments to bones.
- Fascia (from Latin fascia 'band') is a generic term for macroscopic membranous bodily structures.

The human skeleton may be divided into two distinct divisions: the axial skeleton, which includes the vertebral column, and the appendicular skeleton.

==== Action ====
The action of muscles often involve antagonistic pairs of agonist muscles and antagonist muscles, which, respectively, cause and inhibit a movement.

- Through the activation of agonist muscle, which produces most of the force and control of an action, movement occurs.
- Antagonist muscles are the muscles that produce an opposing joint torque to the agonist muscles.
- Synergist muscles, also called fixators or neutralisers, act around a joint to help, counter, or neutralise the action of an agonist muscle.

Generally, as one muscle contracts, the other muscle relaxes in a process known as reciprocal inhibition. Muscle contraction may be concentric (i.e. shortening), eccentric (i.e. lengthening), or isometric (i.e. involving no change in length). Muscle groups (e.g. elbow flexors) are sometimes named based on the joint action they produce during concentric contraction. During muscle contraction, the insertion of a muscle is the structure that is moved and is typically a bone that is distal and lighter than the origin; the origin is the bone, typically proximal, that remains more stable during contraction; the head of a muscle is the end part of the muscle that attaches to its origin.

=== Vascular ===
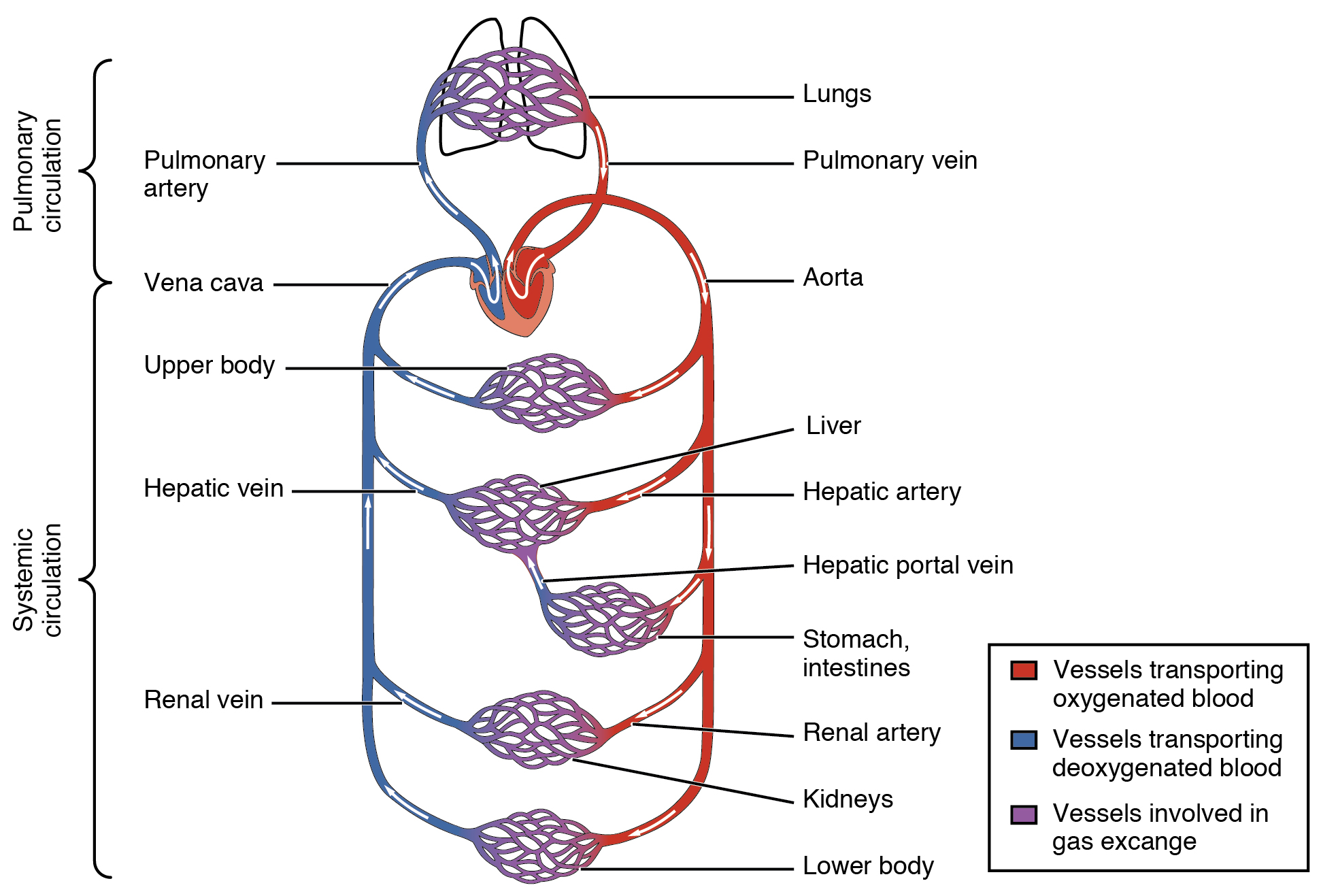
Blood flow in the pulmonary (Latin pulmō, lung) and systemic circulations showing capillary networks in the torso sections

The circulatory system is a system of organs that includes the heart, blood vessels, and blood which is circulated throughout the body. It includes the cardiovascular system, which consists of the heart and blood vessels. Some sources use the terms cardiovascular system, vascular system and circulatory system interchangeably. The lymphatic system (comprising lymphatic vessels, lymph nodes, lymphoid organs, lymphatic tissue and lymph) is complementary to the circulatory system and forms part of the immune system.

==== Circulatory system ====
The network of blood vessels include the great vessels (comprising large elastic arteries and large veins), other arteries (which carry blood away from the heart) and veins (which carry blood to the heart), smaller arterioles, and capillaries, which join with venules. Blood is a fluid consisting of plasma (comprising serum and clotting factors), red blood cells, white blood cells, and platelets. Components of the blood include nutrients (such as proteins and minerals), hemoglobin, hormones, and gases such as oxygen and carbon dioxide. These substances provide nourishment, help the immune system to fight diseases, and help maintain homeostasis through mechanisms such as thermoregulation, osmoregulation, and acid-base regulation.

The circulatory system has two divisions, a systemic circuit (i.e. the left heart pumping oxygenated blood to the rest of the body (via the aorta) and into the right heart (via the venae cava)) and a pulmonary circuit (i.e. the right heart pumping deoxygenated blood to the lungs (via the pulmonary artery) and into the left heart (via the pulmonary vein)). In the human heart:

- There is one atrium (which receives blood) and one ventricle (which expels blood) for each circulation, with a total of four chambers: left atrium, left ventricle, right atrium and right ventricle.
- Chambers of the heart are separated by the atrioventricular valves, which include the tricuspid valve on the right and the mitral valve on the left.
- The ventricles are separated from the large arteries via the semilunar valves.

The heart is lined by a double-layered sac known as the pericardium. Further circulatory routes include the coronary circulation to the heart itself, the cerebral circulation to the brain, renal circulation to the kidneys, and bronchial circulation to the bronchi in the lungs.

==== Lymphatic system ====
The circulatory system processes an average of 20 litres of blood per day through capillary filtration, which removes plasma from the blood. Roughly 17 litres of the filtered blood are reabsorbed directly into the blood vessels. The lymphatic system provides an accessory return route to the blood for the remaining three litres of interstitial fluid.

- Lymph is circulated in the body via muscle contraction and drains into the lymphatic ducts, which empty into the subclavian veins, returning fluid into blood circulation.
- A lymph node is an organised collection of lymphoid tissue through which the lymph passes on its way back to the blood. Lymph nodes are particularly numerous in the mediastinum, neck, pelvis, axilla, and inguinal region.
- Gut-associated lymphoid tissue, including Peyer's patch, plays a major role in the immune system.
- The spleen produces immune cells to fight antigens in its white pulp, removes particulate matter and aged blood cells, mainly red blood cells in its red pulp, and produces blood cells during fetal life.

=== Neuroendocrine ===
The nervous system coordinates the actions and sensory information of a person by transmitting signals to and from different parts of the body, working in tandem with the endocrine system to respond to environmental events. The endocrine system comprises feedback loops of hormones that are released by glands directly into the circulatory system, which target and regulate distant organs. In vertebrates, the hypothalamus is the neural control center for all endocrine systems, being adjacent to the pituatary gland, and linking the two systems together as the neuroendocrine system.

Endocrine glands in the human head and neck and their hormones

==== Nervous system ====
The connections between neurons, the primary cell of the nervous system, forms neural pathways, neural circuits, and large-scale brain networks.

Subsystems of the human nervous system include:

- The central nervous system (CNS), comprising the brain and spinal cord. Nerves that transmit signals from the CNS are called motor nerves. Nerves that exit from the brain are called cranial nerves while those exiting from the spinal cord are called spinal nerves.
- The peripheral nervous system (PNS), comprising mainly nerves, enclosed bundles of axons. The PNS is divided into:
  - The somatic nervous system, which links the brain and spinal cord to sensory receptors and skeletal muscle.
  - The autonomic nervous system, which is subdivided into:
    - The sympathetic nervous system.
    - The parasympathetic nervous system.
    - The enteric nervous system, which controls the gastrointestinal system.
- The neurovascular unit comprises the cells and vasculature channels within the nervous system that regulate cerebral blood flow.

==== Endocrine system ====
The major endocrine glands are the thyroid, parathyroid, pituitary, pineal, and adrenal glands (Latin rēn, rēnes, kidney), and the testis and ovaries. The thyroid secretes thyroxine, the pituitary secretes growth hormone, the pineal secretes melatonin, the testis secretes testosterone, and the ovaries secrete estrogen and progesterone.

The hypothalamus, pancreas, and thymus also function as endocrine glands. The bones, kidneys, liver, heart, and gonads have secondary endocrine functions. Glands that signal each other in sequence are often referred to as an axis, such as the hypothalamic–pituitary–adrenal axis. Endocrinology also comprises the study of the exocrine glands (such as salivary glands, mammary glands, and submucosal glands within the gastrointestinal tract), which secrete hormones to the outside of the body, and of paracrine signalling between cells over a relatively short distance.

=== Ventral ===
The ventral body cavity is a cavity in the anterior aspect of the human body, comprising the thoracic cavity and abdominopelvic cavity.

- The thoracic cavity is protected by the thoracic wall (comprising the rib cage and associated skin, muscle, and fascia), comprising the mediastinum, heart and great vessels, and the bulk of the respiratory tract.
- The abdominal cavity, lined by the peritoneum, contains the bulk of the gastrointestinal tract, the spleen and the kidneys. Abdominal organs may be classified as solid organs or hollow organs.
  - The solid organs are the liver, pancreas, spleen, kidneys, and adrenal glands.
  - The hollow organs of the abdomen are the stomach, intestines, gallbladder, bladder, and rectum.
- The pelvic cavity contains the urinary bladder, internal reproductive organs, and rectum.

Viscera are the internal organs of the ventral cavity. The term "visceral" is contrasted with the term "parietal", meaning "of or relating to the wall of a body part, organ or cavity". The two terms are often used in describing a membrane or piece of connective tissue, referring to the opposing sides.

==== Respiratory system ====
The respiratory system allows for gas exchange, particularly of carbon dioxide and oxygen, in human beings. In the process of breathing or ventilation, the muscles of respiration pump air into the lungs, bringing it into close contact with the blood via millions of microscopic air sacs known as alveoli. The upper respiratory tract includes the nose, nasal cavities, sinuses, pharynx and the part of the larynx above the vocal folds; the lower tract includes the lower part of the larynx and the following aiways: the trachea, bronchi, bronchioles and alveoli. The lungs are surrounded by flattened closed sacs known as pleura.

1. Contraction of the diaphragm (an upwardly domed sheet of muscle that separates the thoracic cavity from the abdominal cavity) and of the intercostal muscles (which lift up the ribs) increases the volume of the thoracic cavity. Because of this increased volume, the lungs (which comprise elastic connective tissue) begin to inflate.
2. Air, usually, enters from the nose. From the nose, air travels into the trachea (the largest of airways) into the two main bronchi, which branch into progressively narrower secondary and tertiary bronchi, which in turn branch into numerous smaller tubes known as the bronchioles, which in turn open into the alveoli.

The process of "respiration" is used to describe three distinct but related processes in the human body: cellular respiration, physiological respiration, and ventilation (or, breathing).

==== Gastrointestinal system ====
The human digestive system, also known as the gastrointestinal system, comprises the gastrointestinal tract and the accessory organs of digestion: the tongue, salivary glands, pancreas, liver, and gallbladder. Digestion involves the breakdown of food into smaller and smaller components, until they can be absorbed and assimilated into the body. The process of digestion has three stages: the cephalic phase, the gastric phase, and the intestinal phase.

- Gallbladder: a hollow part of the biliary tract that sits just beneath the liver, with the gallbladder body resting in a small depression. Commonly associated with gallstones, or cholelithiasis.

==== Reproductive system ====
The reproductive system in humans is typically classified into the male and female reproductive systems.

==== Urinary system ====
The urinary system is the part of the excretory system that removes waste in the form of urine, comprising the kidneys, ureters, bladder, and the urethra. Other purposes of the urinary system include the regulation of blood volume and blood pressure; the control of electrolyte and metabolite levels; and the regulation of blood pH. Each kidney consists of functional units called nephrons. Following filtration of blood and further processing, the ureters carry urine from the kidneys into the urinary bladder. During urination, the urethra carries urine out of the bladder through the penis or vulva. The female and male urinary system are very similar, differing only in the length of the urethra.

== Histology ==
Histology (also known as microanatomy or histoanatomy) is the branch of medicine that studies the microscopic anatomy of biological tissues. Histology is the microscopic counterpart to gross anatomy, which looks at larger structures visible without a microscope. Histopathology is the branch of histology that includes the microscopic identification and study of diseased tissue.

=== Tissue ===
There are four basic types of tissue, of which all other tissues are considered to be subtypes.

- Muscle tissue comprises cardiac, skeletal, and smooth muscle.
  - Smooth muscles control the flow of substances within the lumens of hollow organs, and are not consciously controlled. In the small intestine, smooth muscle contraction is characterised by peristalsis.
  - Skeletal muscles are attached to bones and arranged in opposing groups around joints. Skeletal muscles and cardiac muscles have striations, unlike smooth muscle. Only skeletal and smooth muscles are part of the musculoskeletal system and can move the body.
  - Cardiac muscles are found in the heart and are used only to circulate blood; like the smooth muscles, these muscles are not under conscious control.
- Nervous tissue comprises neuroglia, which provide structural and metabolic support, and neurons, which send signals in the form of electrochemical impulses traveling along axons. Bundles of axons are known as nerve tracts and neural pathways. Impulses can be directly transmitted to neighbouring cells through electrical synapses or cause chemicals called neurotransmitters to be released at chemical synapses.
  - The CNS includes astrocytes (-cyte, 'cell'; Greek κύτος (kútos), a hollow, vessel), oligodendrocytes, ependyma, and radial glia; the PNS includes Schwann cells, satellite glia, and enteric glia.
    - Astrocytes are star-shaped glial cells that have been observed to turn into neurons by virtue of their pluripotency.
  - Microglia are specialized macrophages capable of phagocytosis that protect neurons of the central nervous system.
  - Pituicytes from the posterior pituitary are glial cells with characteristics in common to astrocytes.
  - Tanycytes in the median eminence of the hypothalamus are a type of ependymal cell that descend from radial glia and line the base of the third ventricle.
- Connective tissue is found in between other tissues and comprises connective tissue proper and special connective tissue. Most types of connective tissue consists of three main components: elastic and collagen fibers, ground substance, and cells. Connective tissue membranes include the synovial membrane, which lines the inner surface of capsules of synovial joints, tendon sheaths, and synovial bursas.
  - Connective tissue proper includes loose (or areolar) and dense (regular and irregular) connective tissue. Adipose (Latin adeps, adip-, fat) and reticular connective tissue are regarded by older sources as forms of loose connective tissue alongside areolar tissue, while some newer sources have termed them as forms of special connective tissue.
  - Special connective tissue includes supportive connective tissue (bone and cartilage) and fluid connective tissue (blood and lymph).
- Epithelial tissue are protective tissue that form the glands and outermost layer of many organs, including the skin (epidermis), internal organs (mesothelium), blood and lymphatic vessels (endothelium), as well as specialised organs (e.g. olfactory, respiratory, intestinal, transitional, vaginal, germinal (female), and germinal (male) epithelia). Epithelia control the secretion of hormones into the circulatory system, as well as the secretion of sweat, mucus, enzymes, and other products that are delivered by ducts Epithelial membranes include the serous membrane (which lines body cavities), cutaneous membrane (i.e. the skin), and mucous membrane (which lines the interior of hollow organs). Other functions of epithelial cells include diffusion, filtration, secretion, selective absorption, and transcellular transport.

==== Fibres ====
Fibres found in the extracellular matrix are collagen fibers, elastic fibers, and reticular fibers. Collagen fibres are fixated in intercellular spaces via ground substance, a clear, colorless, and viscous fluid containing glycosaminoglycans and proteoglycans.

| Tissue | Purpose | Components | Location |
|---|---|---|---|
| Collagen fibers | Bind bones and other tissues to each other | Alpha polypeptide chains | Tendon, ligament, skin, cornea, cartilage, bone, blood vessels, gut, intervertebral disc; loose and dense-irregular connective tissue |
| Elastic fibers | Allow organs to recoil; provide resistance to stretch forces | Elastic microfibril, elastin, fibrillin | Extracellular matrix, walls of large blood vessels, certain ligaments (e.g. ligamenta flava) |
| Reticular fibers | Form a scaffolding for other cells; provides the stroma for the parenchyma of an organ | Type III collagen | Liver, bone marrow, and lymphatic organs; hematopoietic and lymphatic tissue |

==== Secretion ====
Types of secretion include:

- Apocrine
- Merocrine
- Holocrine
- Endocrine
- Exocrine
- Paracrine

=== Cellular ===
==== Nervous ====
Diagram of a neuron

The neuron is the primary cell of the nervous system, supported structurally and metabolically by the glia. Neurons comprise the following specialised organelles:

- Soma, the body of the neuron. Containing the nucleus, most protein synthesis occurs here.
- Dendrites, cellular extensions with many branches. The branches form fractal patterns that repeat at multiple size scales. The majority of input to the neuron occurs via the dendritic spine.
- Axon, a finer and longer cable-like projection. The axon primarily carries nerve signals away from the soma and carries some types of information back to it. Many neurons have only one axon, but this axon will usually undergo extensive branching, enabling communication with many target cells.
  - Axon hillock, the part of the axon that emerges from the soma. The axon hillock also has the greatest density of voltage-dependent sodium channels and the most negative threshold potential, making it the most easily-excited part of the neuron and the spike initiation zone for the axon.
  - Axon terminal, found at the end of the axon farthest from the soma. Contains synapses.

Neurons communicate with other cells via synapses, specialised structures that connect neurons and facilitate the transmission of electrical and chemical signals.

- In electrical synapses, the presynaptic and postsynaptic cell membranes are connected by special channels called gap junctions that are capable of facilitating the direct flow of electrical current without the need for neurotransmitters, causing voltage changes in the presynaptic cell to induce voltage changes in the postsynaptic cell.
- In chemical synapses, the activation of voltage-gated calcium channels in the presynaptic neuron results in the release of neurotransmitters into the synaptic cleft, which thereafter bind to receptors located in the plasma membrane of the postsynaptic cell.
  - The neurotransmitter may initiate an electrical response or a secondary messenger pathway that may either excite or inhibit the postsynaptic neuron. Chemical synapses can be classified according to the neurotransmitter released: glutamatergic (often excitatory), GABAergic (often inhibitory), cholinergic (e.g. vertebrate neuromuscular junction), and adrenergic (releasing norepinephrine). Depending on their release location, the receptors they bind to, and the ionic circumstances they encounter, various transmitters can be either excitatory or inhibitory. For instance, acetylcholine can either excite or inhibit depending on the type of receptors it binds to.
    - In excitatory synapses, an influx of Na+ driven by excitatory neurotransmitters opens cation channels, enhancing the probability of depolarization in postsynaptic neurons and the initiation of an action potential.
    - In inhibitory synapses, the opening of either Cl- or K+ channels diminish the probability of depolarization in postsynaptic neurons and the initiation of an action potential.

Astrocytes also exchange information with the synaptic neurons, responding to synaptic activity and, in turn, regulating neurotransmission.

==== Connective tissue proper ====
Types of connective tissue cells include:

- Fibrocyte
- Mesenchyme
- Adipocyte
- Fibroblast (Greek βλαστός (blastós), germinate or bud)

==== Epithelial ====
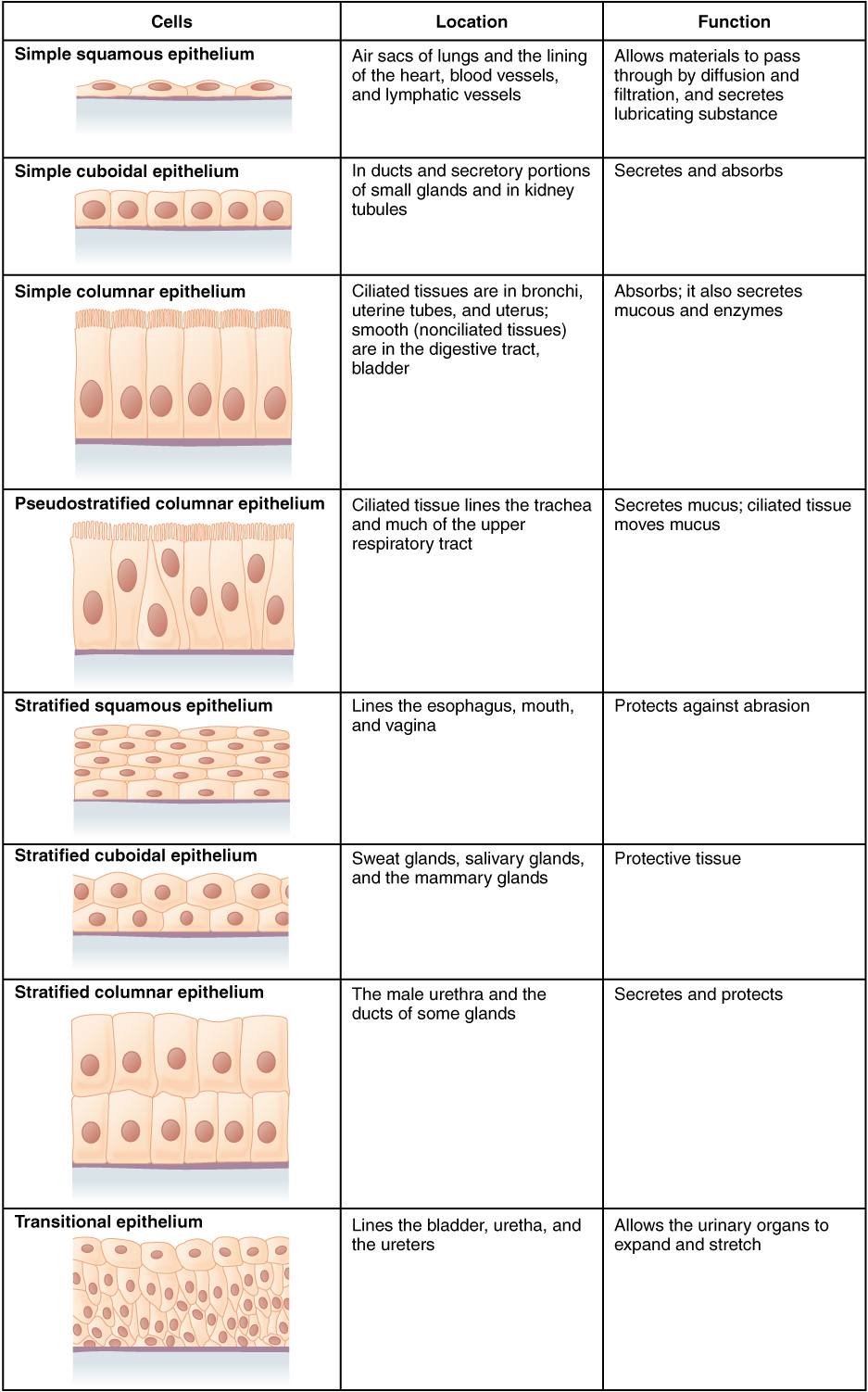
Summary showing different epithelial cells/tissues and their characteristics.

The basal surface of epithelial tissue rests on a basement membrane and the free, apical, or apex surface faces body fluid or the outside. The basement membrane acts as a scaffolding on which epithelium can grow and regenerate after injuries, and comprises the basal lamina and reticular lamina; although, some older sources use basement membrane and basal lamina synonymously. The basement membrane acts as a selectively permeable membrane that determines which substances will be able to enter the epithelium, as epithelial tissue has a nerve supply though no blood supply.

There are three principal shapes of epithelial cell: squamous (scaly), columnar, and cuboidal. Transitional epithelium has cells that can change from squamous to cuboidal, depending on the amount of tension on the epithelium. Epithelial tissue can be further categorised as having a singular layer of cells as simple epithelium; or as layers of two or more cells deep as stratified epithelium—stratified squamous epithelium, stratified cuboidal epithelium, and stratified columnar epithelium. When taller simple columnar epithelial cells are viewed in cross section showing several nuclei appearing at different heights, they can be confused with stratified epithelia, and are thus termed as pseudostratified columnar epithelium. Epithelial cells are often ciliated.

Stratified epithelia be further divided into keratinised, parakeratinised, and transitional epithelia or urothelia.

Cell junctions, protein complexes that provide contact between cells and neighbouring cells or the extracellular matrix, are especially abundant in epithelial tissues. They build up the paracellular barrier of epithelia and control the paracellular transport. There are five main types of cell junctions: tight junctions, adherens junctions, desmosomes, hemidesmosomes, and gap junctions.

=== Molecular ===
==== Genetics ====
Major processes in genetics include:

- Translation (biology)
- Transcription (biology)

==== Signalling ====
Molecules involved in cell signalling include:

- Glycoprotein
- Steroid
- Prostaglandin

== Internal medicine ==
=== Immunology ===
Immunology is the branch of medicine that deals with the immune system, a network of biological systems that protects humans from diseases. The immune system detects and responds to pathogens, such as viruses, bacteria, and parasites, as well as cancer cells and foreign bodies. Humans have two major immune subsystems: The innate immune system, which provides a preconfigured response (e.g. defensins, complement system) to broad groups of situations and stimuli; and the adaptive immune system, which provides a tailored response to each stimulus by developing an immunological memory of molecules previously encountered. Mechanisms common to both subsystems, include phagocytosis, humoural immunity, cell-mediated immunity.

==== Innate immunity ====
Cells in the innate immune system use pattern recognition receptors to recognize molecular structures produced by pathogens, identifying two classes of molecules: pathogen-associated molecular patterns (PAMPs), which are associated with microbial pathogens, and damage-associated molecular patterns (DAMPs), which are associated with components of hosts' cells that are released during cell damage or cell death.

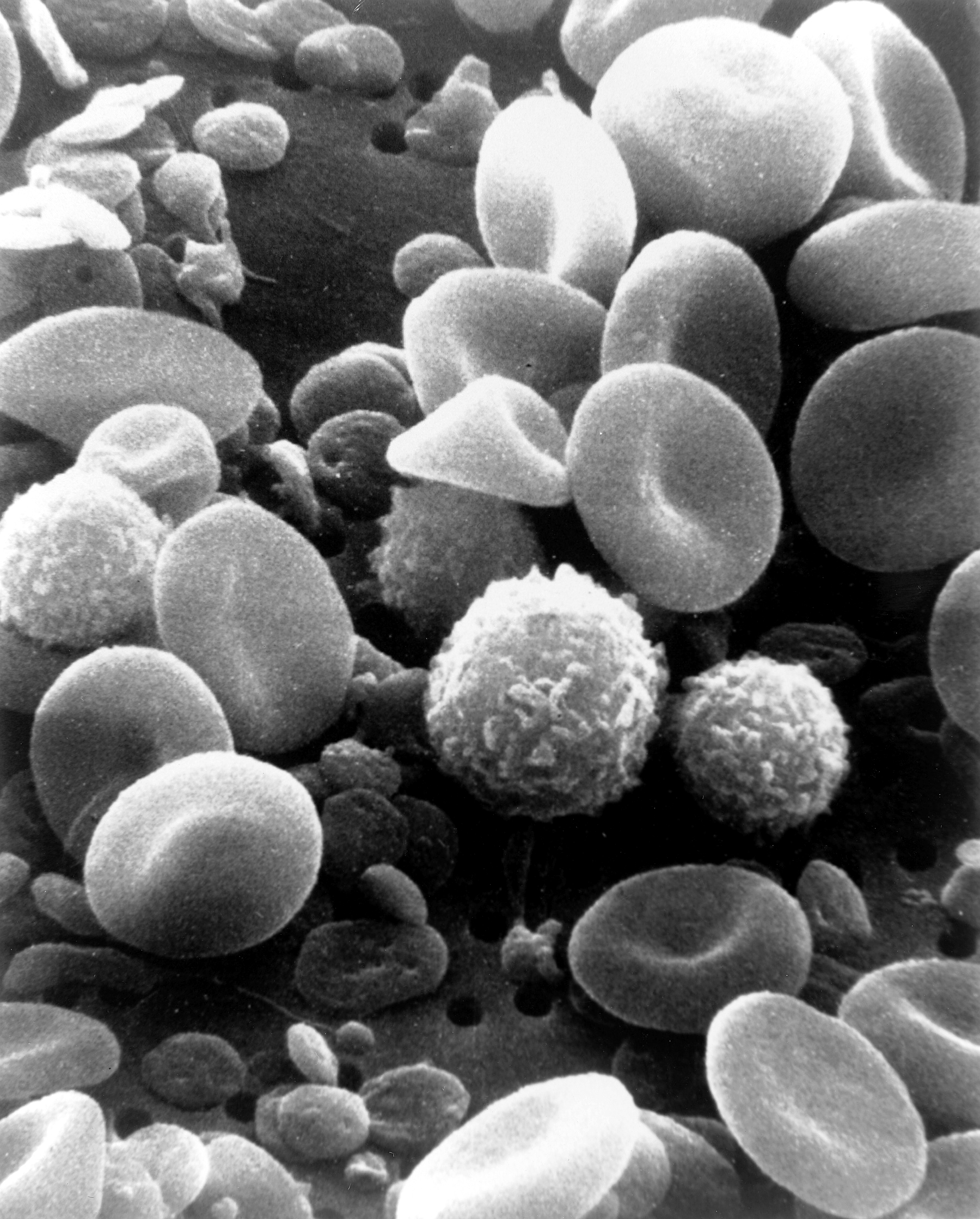
A scanning electron microscope image of normal circulating human blood. One can see red blood cells, several knobby white blood cells, including lymphocytes, a monocyte, and a neutrophil, and many small disc-shaped platelets.

Leukocytes (commonly known as white blood cells) act like independent, single-celled organisms and are the second arm of the innate immune system. The innate leukocytes include:

- The professional phagocytes, which generally patrol the body searching for pathogens, but can be called to specific locations by cytokines. Once a pathogen has been engulfed by a phagocyte, it becomes trapped in an intracellular vesicle called a phagosome, which subsequently fuses with a lysosome vesicle to form a phagolysosome. The pathogen is then killed by the activity of digestive enzymes or following a respiratory burst that releases free radicals into the phagolysosome.
  - Macrophages and neutrophils, which travel around the body in pursuit of invading pathogens.
    - Macrophages are cells that reside within tissues and produce an array of chemicals including enzymes, complement proteins, and cytokines. They also rid the body of worn-out cells and other debris and act as antigen-presenting cells that activate the adaptive immune system.
    - Neutrophils are normally found in the bloodstream and are the most abundant type of phagocyte, representing 50% to 60% of total circulating leukocytes. During the acute phase of inflammation, neutrophils migrate toward the site of inflammation in a process called chemotaxis and are usually the first cells to arrive at the scene of infection.
  - Dendritic cells are phagocytes in tissues that are in contact with the external environment, located mainly in the skin, nose, lungs, stomach, and intestines. Dendritic cells are a link between bodily tissues and the innate and adaptive immune systems, as they present antigens to T cells.
- Granulocytes (i.e. leukocytes with specific granules), which include the neutrophils, innate lymphoid cells, mast cells, eosinophils, and basophils.
  - Innate lymphoid cells (ILCs) derived from common lymphoid progenitor and belong to the lymphoid lineage.
  - Mast cells reside in connective tissues and mucous membranes and regulate the inflammatory response. They are most often associated with allergy and anaphylaxis.
  - Basophils and eosinophils are related to neutrophils. They secrete chemical mediators that are involved in defending against parasites and play a role in allergic reactions, such as asthma.
- Natural killer cells (NK cells) do not directly attack invading microbes but destroy compromised host cells, such as tumor cells or virus-infected cells. NK cells recognise such cells by a condition known as "missing self", which involves low levels of a cell-surface marker called MHC I (major histocompatibility complex)—a situation that can arise in viral infection. Normal body cells are not recognized and attacked by NK cells because they express intact self MHC antigens, which inhibit NK cell activity.
- Monocytes, upon moving to injured tissue, turn into dendritic cells and macrophages while promoting tissue healing.

The major humoral component of the innate immune response is the complement system, a biochemical cascade that attacks the surfaces of foreign cells. This response is activated by the binding of complement proteins to carbohydrates on the surfaces of microbes, or to antibodies that have attached to these microbes, which creates a cell signal that triggers a rapid killing response, whose speed is significantly amplified after sequential proteolytic activation of complement protease molecules, controlled by positive feedback. The cascade results in the production of peptides that attract immune cells; increase vascular permeability; and opsonize the surface of a pathogen, marking it for destruction. Complement binding can also kill cells directly by disrupting their plasma membrane via a membrane attack complex.

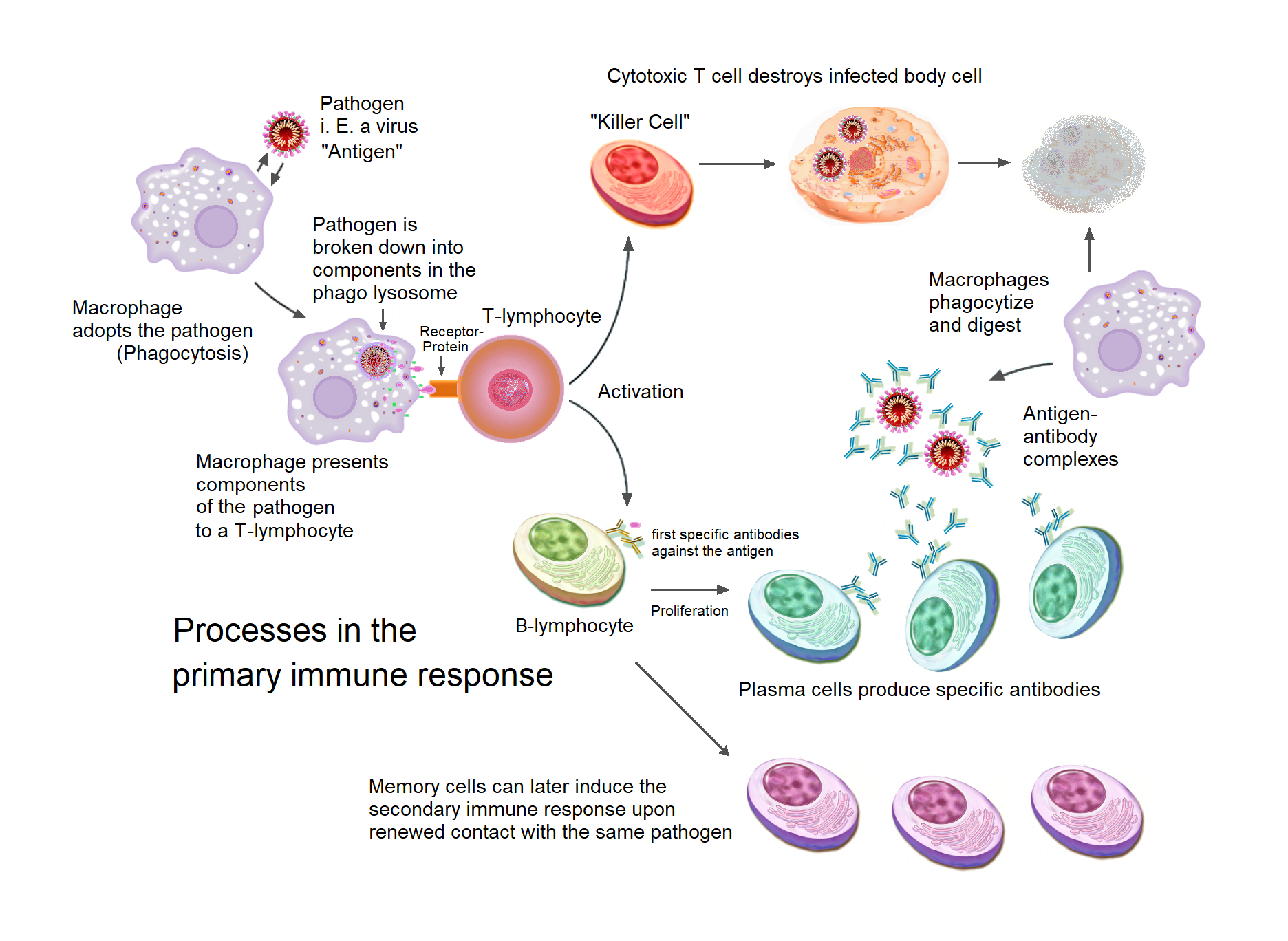
Overview of the processes involved in the primary immune response

===== Inflammation =====
Inflammation is one of the first responses of the immune system to infection. It is produced by eicosanoids and cytokines, which are released by injured or infected cells. In response to cytosolic PAMPs and DAMPs, pattern-recognition receptors called inflammasomes form in order to generate active forms of the inflammatory cytokines IL-1β and IL-18.

- Eicosanoids include prostaglandins that produce fever and the dilation of blood vessels associated with inflammation and leukotrienes that attract certain white blood cells (leukocytes).
- Common cytokines include interleukins that are responsible for communication between white blood cells; chemokines that promote chemotaxis; and interferons that have antiviral effects, such as shutting down protein synthesis in the host cell.

Growth factors and cytotoxic factors may also be released. These chemicals recruit immune cells to the site of infection and promote the healing of any damaged tissue following the removal of pathogens.

==== Adaptive immune system ====
The adaptive immune system allows for a stronger immune response as well as immunological memory, where each pathogen is "remembered" by a signature antigen. The adaptive immune response is antigen-specific, allowing for the generation of tailored immune responses, and requiring the recognition of specific "non-self" antigens during a process called antigen presentation. The ability to mount these tailored responses is maintained in the body by memory T-cells and memory B-cells, which may be employed rapidly should a pathogen infect the body more than once.

B cells and T cells are the major types of lymphocytes, which form the cells of the adaptive immune system. B cells are involved in the humoral immune response, while T cells are involved in cell-mediated immune response. When B or T cells encounter their related antigens they multiply, and many "clones" of the cells are produced that target the same antigen. This is called clonal selection. Some of the offspring of these B and T cells become long-lived memory cells, which remember each specific pathogen encountered and can mount a strong response if the pathogen is detected again. T-cells recognize pathogens by antigens that bind directly to T-cell surface receptors. B-cells use the protein, immunoglobulin, to recognise pathogens by their antigens.

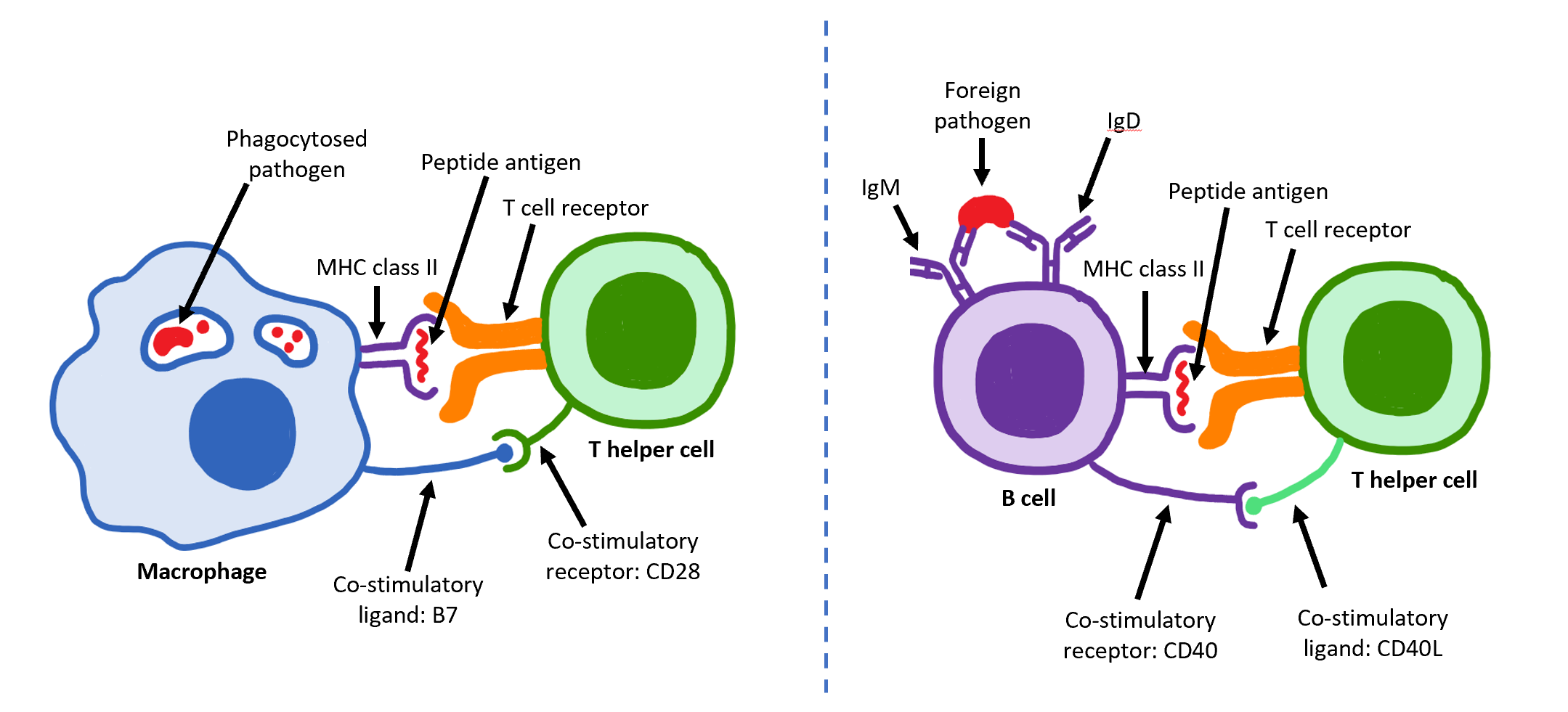
Activation of macrophage or B cell by T helper cell

- Killer T cells kill cells that are infected with pathogens or otherwise damaged or dysfunctional, which contain a complex of a specific antigen coupled to a Class I MHC receptor. When the receptor of a cytotoxic or "killer" T-cell contacts such cells, it releases cytotoxins, such as perforin, which form pores in the target cell's plasma membrane, allowing ions, water and toxins to enter. The entry of another toxin called granulysin induces the target cell to undergo apoptosis.
- Helper T cells and regulatory T cells only recognize antigens coupled to Class II MHC molecules.
  - Helper T cells regulate both the innate and adaptive immune responses and help determine which immune responses the body makes to a particular pathogen. These cells have no cytotoxic activity and do not kill infected cells or clear pathogens directly. They instead control the immune response by directing other cells to perform these tasks.
- A third, minor subtype are the γδ T cells, which recognise intact antigens that are not bound to MHC receptors.
- A B cell identifies pathogens when antibodies on its surface bind to a specific foreign antigen. This antigen/antibody complex is taken up by the B cell and processed by proteolysis into peptides. The B cell then displays these antigenic peptides on its surface MHC class II molecules, which attracts a matching helper T cell that releases lymphokines and activates the B cell. As the activated B cell then begins to divide, its offspring (plasma cells) secrete millions of copies of the antibody that recognizes this antigen. These antibodies circulate in blood plasma and lymph, bind to pathogens expressing the antigen and mark them for destruction by complement activation or for uptake and destruction by phagocytes. Antibodies can also neutralize challenges directly, by binding to bacterial toxins or by interfering with the receptors that viruses and bacteria use to infect cells.

==== Lymphatic system ====
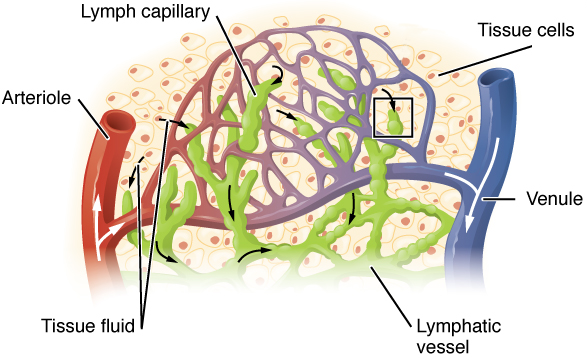
Lymph capillaries in the tissue spaces

Lymph contains cellular debris, bacteria, proteins, and lymphocytes, the latter of which are generated largely in the bone marrow and matured or activated in the lymph nodes, spleen, thymus, and tonsils. Lymph also transports antigen-presenting cells, such as dendritic cells, to the lymph nodes where an immune response is stimulated.

B cells and T cells are the major types of lymphocytes and are derived from hematopoietic stem cells in the bone marrow. From the bone marrow, B cells immediately join the circulatory system and travel to secondary lymphoid organs in search of pathogens. T cells, on the other hand, travel from the bone marrow to the thymus, where they develop further, mature, and become immunocompetent. In the thymus, T cells are exposed to a wide variety of self-antigens; T cells can only recognize a "non-self" target only after antigens have been processed and presented in combination with the major histocompatibility complex (MHC) self-receptor. In contrast, the B cell antigen-specific receptor is an antibody molecule on the B cell surface, recognising unprocessed antigens (e.g. large molecules found on the surfaces of pathogens; small haptens, such as penicillin, attached to carrier molecules) without any need for antigen processing. Each lineage of B cell expresses a different antibody, so the complete set of B cell antigen receptors represents all the antibodies that the human body can manufacture.

The secondary (or peripheral) lymphoid organs (e.g. lymph nodes and the spleen) maintain mature naive T cells and naive B cells; initiate the adaptive immune response; and are the sites of lymphocyte activation by antigens, which leads to clonal selection and affinity maturation.

==== Immunotherapy ====
Dysfunction of the immune system can cause autoimmune diseases, inflammatory diseases and cancer. Immunodeficiency occurs when the immune system is less active than normal, resulting in recurring and life-threatening infections, and can be the result of a genetic disease such as severe combined immunodeficiency, acquired conditions such as HIV/AIDS, or the use of immunosuppressive medication. Autoimmunity describes a hyperactive immune system attacking normal tissues as if they were foreign organisms; diseases include Hashimoto's thyroiditis, rheumatoid arthritis, diabetes mellitus type 1, and systemic lupus erythematosus.

- Immunomodulation

=== Endocrinology ===
Hormones include:

- Calcitonin

=== Oncology ===
List of cancer types:

- Carcinoma: Cancers derived from epithelial cells. This group includes many of the most common cancers that occur in older adults. Nearly all cancers developing in the breast, prostate, lung, pancreas, and colon are carcinomas.
- Sarcoma: Cancers arising from connective tissue (i.e. bone, cartilage, fat, nerve), each of which develop from cells originating in mesenchymal cells outside of the bone marrow.
- Lymphoma and leukemia: These two classes of cancer arise from immature cells that originate in the bone marrow, and are intended to fully differentiate and mature into normal components of the immune system and the blood, respectively. Acute lymphoblastic leukemia is the most common type of cancer in children, accounting for ~30% of cases. However, far more adults than children develop lymphoma and leukemia.
- Germ cell tumor: Cancers derived from pluripotent cells, most often presenting in the testicle or the ovary(seminoma and dysgerminoma, respectively).
- Blastoma: Cancers derived from immature "precursor" cells or embryonic tissue. Blastomas are generally more common in children (e.g. neuroblastoma, retinoblastoma, nephroblastoma, hepatoblastoma, medulloblastoma, etc.) than in older adults.

Types of benign tumours
| Cell origin | Cell type | Tumor |
|---|---|---|
| Endodermal | Biliary tree | Cholangioma |
| Endodermal | Colon | Colonic polyp |
| Endodermal | Glandular | Adenoma |
| Endodermal | Glandular | Papilloma |
| Endodermal | Glandular | Cystadenoma |
| Endodermal | Liver | Liver cell adenoma |
| Endodermal | Placental | Hydatiform mole |
| Endodermal | Renal | Renal tubular adenoma |
| Endodermal | Squamous | Squamous cell papilloma |
| Endodermal | Stomach | Gastric polyp |
| Mesenchymal | Blood vessel | Hemangioma, Cardiac myxoma |
| Mesenchymal | Bone | Osteoma |
| Mesenchymal | Cartilage | Chondroma |
| Mesenchymal | Fat tissue | Lipoma |
| Mesenchymal | Fibrous tissue | Fibroma |
| Mesenchymal | Lymphatic vessel | Lymphangioma |
| Mesenchymal | Smooth muscle | Leiomyoma |
| Mesenchymal | Striated muscle | Rhabdomyoma |
| Ectodermal | Glia | Astrocytoma, Schwannoma |
| Ectodermal | Melanocytes | Nevus |
| Ectodermal | Meninges | Meningioma |
| Ectodermal | Nerve cells | Ganglioneuroma |

== By organ system and medical specialty ==
=== Ophthalmology ===
Ophthalmology is the branch of medicine specialising in the eyes.

=== Neurology and psychiatry ===
Neurology is the branch of medicine dedicated to the nervous system

==== Neuroanatomy ====
Neuroanatomy is the study of the anatomy of the brain and rest of the nervous system and uses a number of specialised anatomical terms of neuroanatomy:

- A gyrus is an outward folding of the brain, for example the precentral gyrus.
- A sulcus is an inward fold, or valley in the brain's surface, for example the central sulcus and lateral sulcus.
Structural and functional areas of the human brain

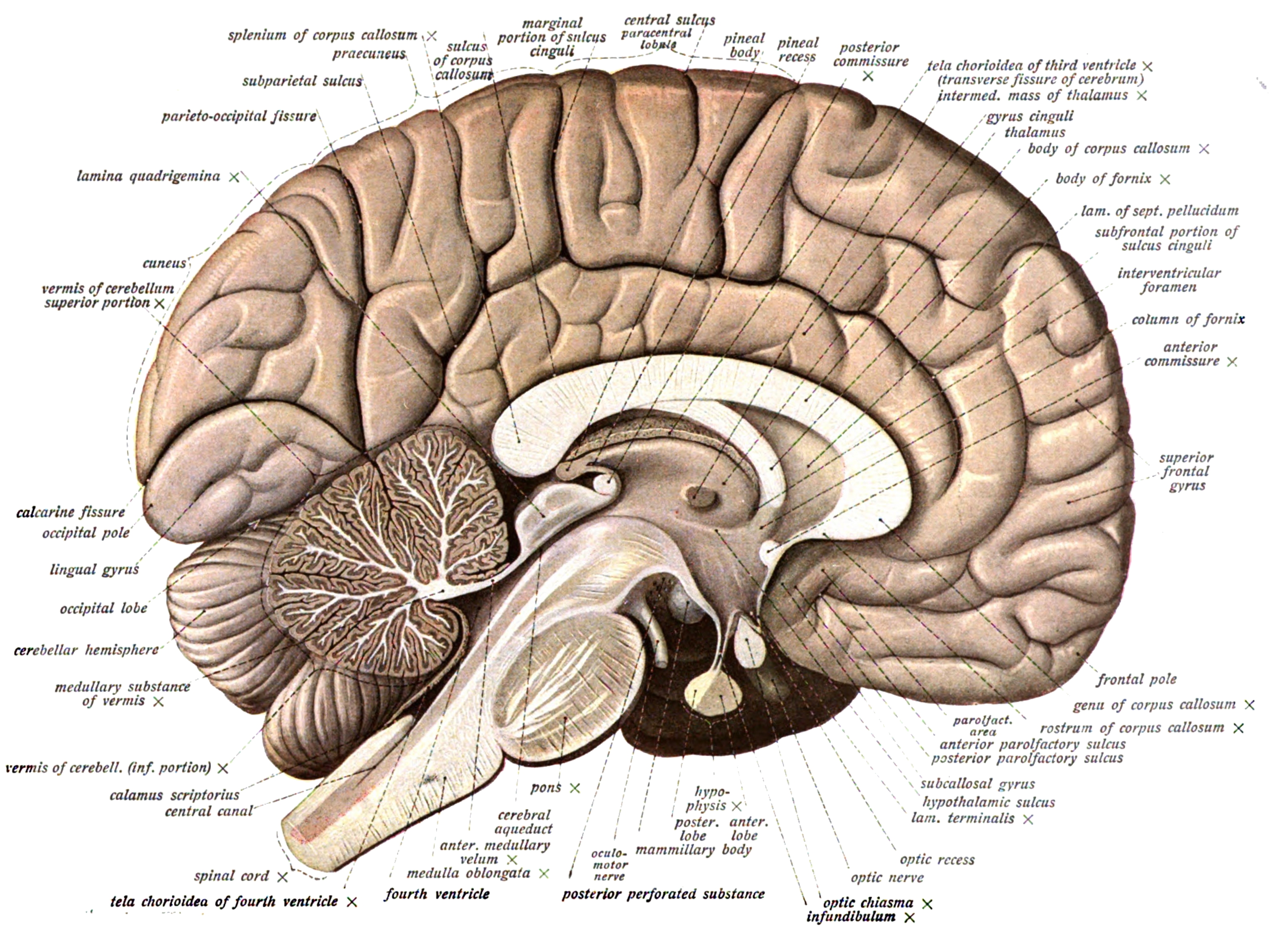
Human brain bisected in the sagittal plane, showing the white matter of the corpus callosum

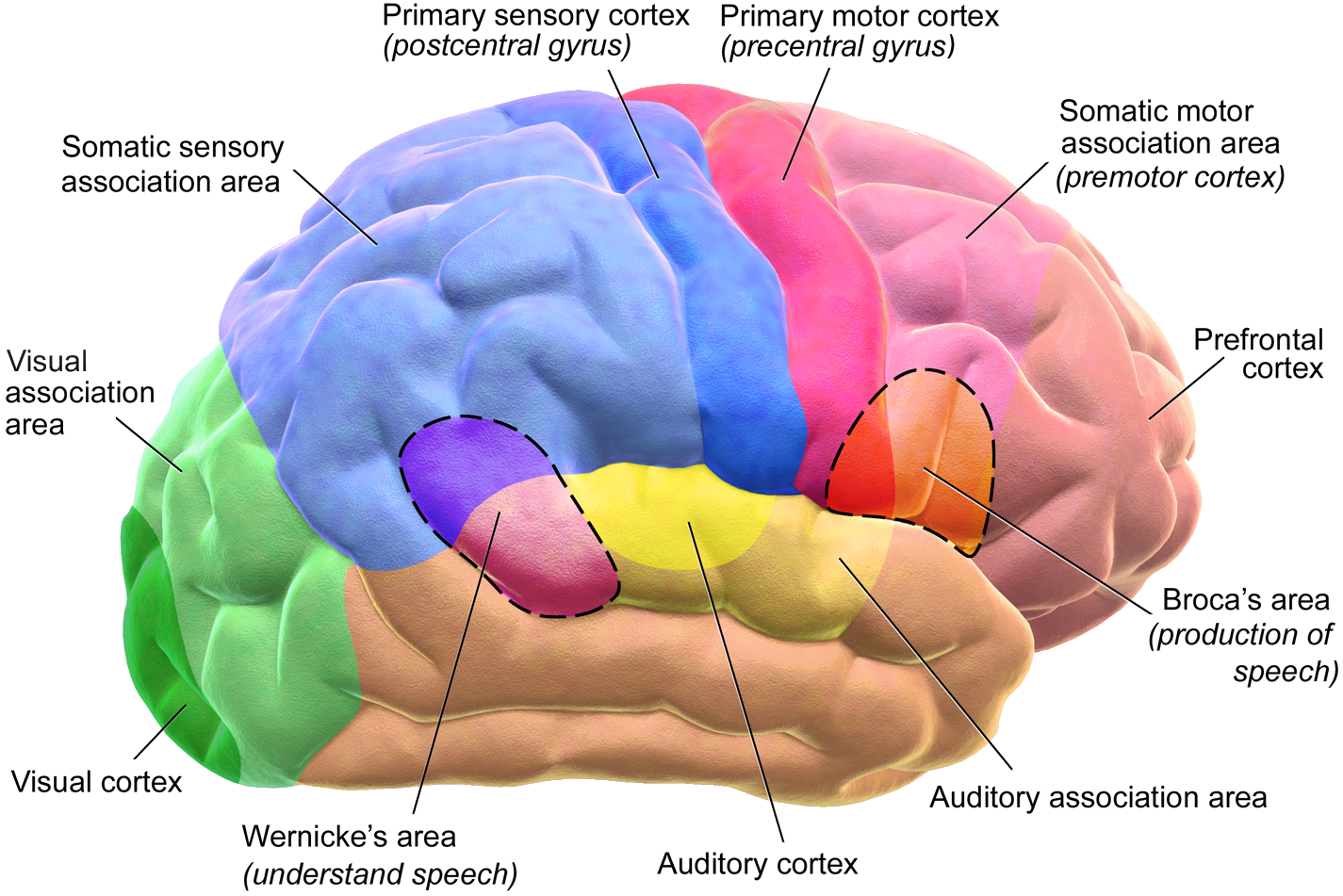
Functional areas of the human brain. Dashed areas shown are commonly left hemisphere dominant.

The human brain contains multiple regions, as does the spinal cord. There are multiple ways to divide the brain, including by the embryological development of the brain; into three parts: the cerebellum, brainstem, and cerebrum; the evolution of the brain; and cytoarchitecture, as in the case of Brodmann areas. A popular model of the 'triune brain' — comprising the reptilian complex (basal ganglia), the paleomammalian complex (limbic system), and the neomammalian complex (neocortex) — was formerly popular during the 1960s, though is now regarded as a myth. 'Limbic system' and associated terms, however, remain in neuroanatomical use, although some neuroscientists have argued against such use.

| Early embryological brain | Later embryological brain | | Structures | Sub-structures | Brodmann area | By parts | |
|---|---|---|---|---|---|---|---|
| Hindbrain, or rhombencephalon | Metencephalon | | Cerebellum | Tentorium; Vermis; Peduncles; Nuclei; Lobes; Flocculonodular lobe; Anterior lobe; Posterior lobe | | Cerebellum | |
| Hindbrain, or rhombencephalon | Metencephalon | | Fourth ventricle | | | (Part of cerebrum) | |
| Hindbrain, or rhombencephalon | Metencephalon | | Pons | | | Brainstem | Pons |
| Hindbrain, or rhombencephalon | Myelencephalon | | Medulla oblongata | | | Brainstem | Medulla oblongata |
| Midbrain, or mesencephalon | | | Cerebral peduncle | | | Brainstem | Cerebral peduncle |
| Midbrain, or mesencephalon | | | Cerebral aqueduct | | | Brainstem | Cerebral aqueduct |
| Midbrain, or mesencephalon | | | Tectum | Superior colliculus | | Brainstem | Superior colliculus |
| Midbrain, or mesencephalon | | | Tectum | Inferior colliculus | | Brainstem | Inferior colliculus |
| Midbrain, or mesencephalon | | | Tegmentum | | | Brainstem | Tegmentum |
| Forebrain, or prosencephalon | Cerebrum, or telencephalon | White matter | White matter | | | Cerebrum | White matter |
| Forebrain, or prosencephalon | Cerebrum, or telencephalon | Subcortical cerebrum | Basal ganglia | | | Cerebrum | Basal ganglia |
| Forebrain, or prosencephalon | Cerebrum, or telencephalon | Subcortical cerebrum | Amygdala | | | Cerebrum | Amygdala |
| Forebrain, or prosencephalon | Cerebrum, or telencephalon | Subcortical cerebrum | Hippocampus | | | Cerebrum | Hippocampus |
| Forebrain, or prosencephalon | Cerebrum, or telencephalon | Subcortical cerebrum | Basal forebrain | | | Cerebrum | Basal forebrain |
| Forebrain, or prosencephalon | Cerebrum, or telencephalon | Subcortical cerebrum | Claustrum | | | Cerebrum | Claustrum |
| Forebrain, or prosencephalon | Cerebrum, or telencephalon | Paleocortical cerebrum | Rhinencephalon | Piriform cortex | | Cerebrum | Rhinencephalon |
| Forebrain, or prosencephalon | Cerebrum, or telencephalon | Neocortical cerebrum | Cerebral cortex | Frontal lobe: Prefrontal cortex | 4 (primary motor cortex); 6 (premotor cortex, supplementary motor area); 8, 9, 10, and 46 (dorsolateral prefrontal cortex); 11 and 12 (orbitofrontal cortex); 24, 32, and 33 (anterior cingulate cortex); 25 (ventromedial prefrontal cortex); 44 and 45 (Broca's area); 47 (pars orbitalis) | Cerebrum | Frontal lobe |
| Forebrain, or prosencephalon | Cerebrum, or telencephalon | Neocortical cerebrum | Cerebral cortex | Parietal lobe: Postcentral gyrus | 3, 1, and 2 (primary somatosensory cortex); 5 and 7 (superior parietal lobule); 23 and 31 (posterior cingulate cortex); 26; 29 and 30 (retrosplenial cortex); 39 (angular gyrus); 40 (supramarginal gyrus) | Cerebrum | Parietal lobe |
| Forebrain, or prosencephalon | Cerebrum, or telencephalon | Neocortical cerebrum | Cerebral cortex | Occipital lobe | 17, 18, and 19 (visual cortex); 37 (fusiform gyrus) | Cerebrum | Occipital lobe |
| Forebrain, or prosencephalon | Cerebrum, or telencephalon | Neocortical cerebrum | Cerebral cortex | Temporal lobe: Parahippocampal gyrus; Wernicke's area | 15; 20 (inferior temporal gyrus); 21 (middle temporal gyrus); 22 (superior temporal gyrus); 27 (presubiculum); 28 and 34 (entorhinal cortex); 35 and 36 (perirhinal cortex); 38; 41 and 42 (auditory cortex); 48; 52 | Cerebrum | Temporal lobe |
| Forebrain, or prosencephalon | Cerebrum, or telencephalon | Neocortical cerebrum | Cerebral cortex | Insular cortex | 13, 14 and 16 (insular cortex); 43 (gustatory cortex) | Cerebrum | Insular cortex |
| Forebrain, or prosencephalon | Diencephalon | | Thalamus | | | Cerebrum | Thalamus |
| Forebrain, or prosencephalon | Diencephalon | | Epithalamus | Pineal gland | | Cerebrum | Epithalamus |
| Forebrain, or prosencephalon | Diencephalon | | Hypothalamus | | | Cerebrum | Hypothalamus |
| Forebrain, or prosencephalon | Diencephalon | | Subthalamus | | | Cerebrum | Subthalamus |
| Forebrain, or prosencephalon | Diencephalon | | Pituitary gland | | | Cerebrum | Pituitary gland |
| Forebrain, or prosencephalon | Diencephalon | | Third ventricle | | | Cerebrum | Ventricular system |
| | | | | | | Cerebrum | Cerebral fissure |
| | | | | | | Cerebrum | Commissural fiber: Corpus callosum |

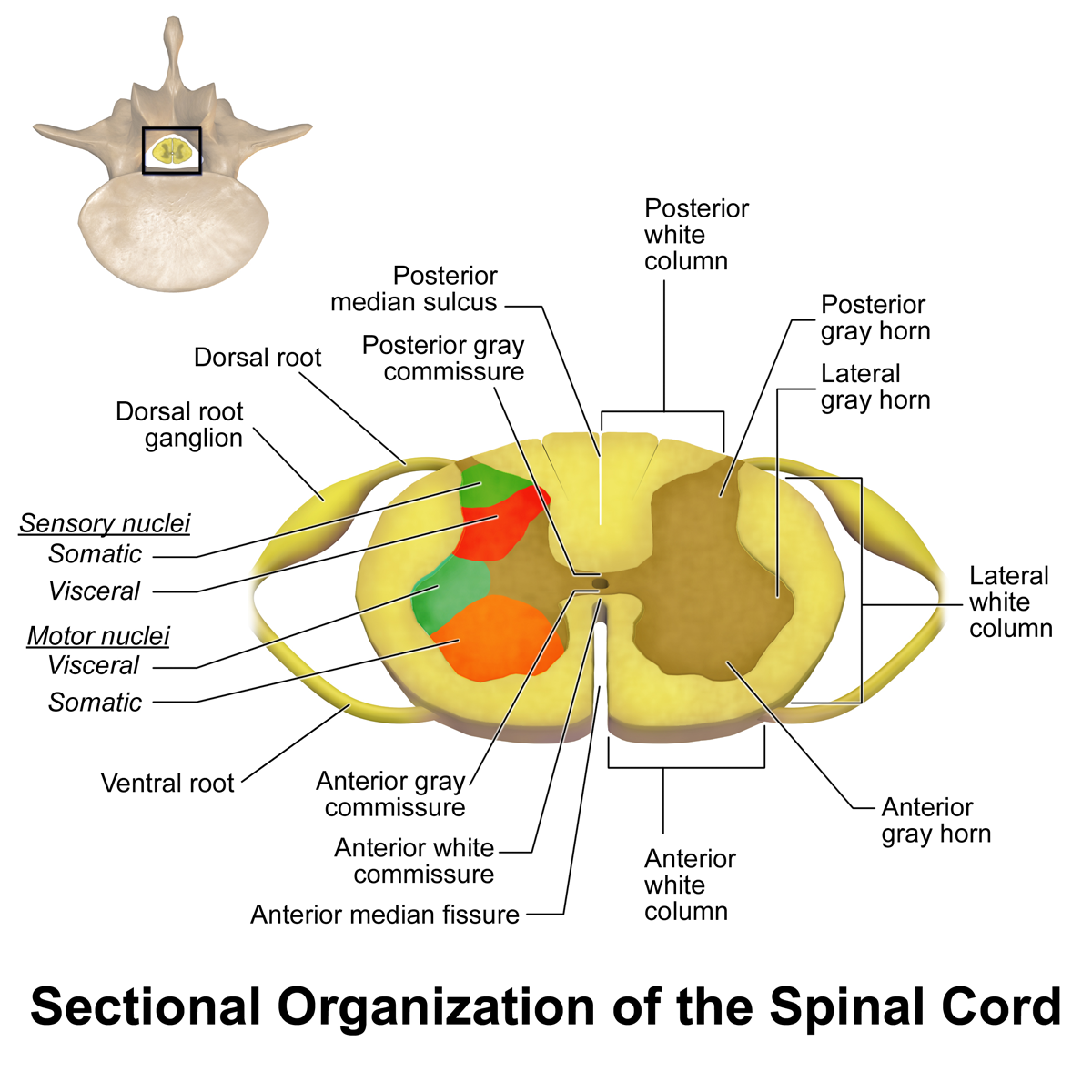
Sectional organization of spinal cord

Various other neuroanatomical systems have been developed according to functions, connections, and systems of the brain.

- Neuroendocrine axes
  - Hypothalamic–pituitary–adrenal axis
  - Hypothalamic–neurohypophyseal system
  - Hypothalamic–pituitary–gonadal axis
  - Hypothalamic–pituitary–thyroid axis
- Limbic system, corresponding to
  - Cortical areas:
    - Limbic lobe
    - Orbitofrontal cortex
    - Piriform cortex part of the olfactory system
    - Entorhinal cortex
    - Hippocampus and associated structures
    - Fornix and septal nuclei
  - Subcortical areas:
    - Septal nuclei
    - Amygdala
    - Nucleus accumbens
  - Diencephalic structures:
    - Hypothalamus
    - Mammillary bodies
    - Anterior nuclei of thalamus

==== Neuropathology ====
In the peripheral nervous system, the most common problem is the failure of nerve conduction, which can be due to different causes including diabetic neuropathy and demyelinating disorders such as multiple sclerosis and amyotrophic lateral sclerosis.

==== Psychopathology ====
- List of mental disorders

== Pathology ==
- Lists of diseases
- Pathology
- List of abbreviations for diseases and disorders

=== -plasia and -trophy ===
The suffix -plasia refers to the formation and development of cells, tissue, and organs, coming from Greek πλᾰ́σῐς (plásis), moulding, conformation.

- Achondroplasia (dwarfism)
- Anaplasia (structural differentiation loss within a cell or group of cells)
- Aplasia (organ or part of organ missing)
- Desmoplasia (connective tissue growth)
- Dysplasia (change in cell or tissue phenotype)
- Hyperplasia (proliferation of cells)
- Hypoplasia (congenital below-average number of cells, especially when inadequate)
- Metaplasia (conversion in cell type)
- Neoplasia (abnormal proliferation)
- Prosoplasia (development of new cell function)

The suffix trophy refers to the nourishment and development of cells, tissue, and organs, coming from Greek τροφή (trophḗ), food, nourishment.

- Abiotrophy (loss in vitality of organ or tissue)
- Atrophy (reduced functionality of an organ, with decrease in the number or volume of cells)
- Hypertrophy (increase in the volume of cells or tissues)
- Hypotrophy (decrease in the volume of cells or tissues)
- Dystrophy (any degenerative disorder resulting from improper or faulty nutrition)
- Pseudohypertrophy (false enlargement of muscle)

=== Other pathology suffixes ===
| Affix | Meaning | Origin language and etymology | Example(s) |
|---|---|---|---|
| -aemia, ema, hemat, -emia | blood condition | Greek ἀναιμία (anaimía), without blood | anaemia |
| -asthenia | weakness | Greek ἀσθένεια (asthéneia), sick, weak | myasthenia gravis |
| ather- | fatty deposit, soft gruel-like deposit | ἀθάρη (athárē) | atherosclerosis |
| brady- | slow | Greek βραδύς (bradús), slow | bradycardia |
| -cele | pouching, hernia | Greek κήλη (kḗlē) | hydrocele, varicocele |
| -dipsia | thirst | Greek δίψα (dípsa) | dipsomania, polydipsia |
| -dynia | pain | Greek ὀδύνη (odúnē) | vulvodynia |
| dys- | bad, difficult, defective, abnormal | Greek δυσ- (dus-) | dysentery, dysphagia, dysphasia |
| -ectasia, -ectasis | expansion, dilation | Greek ἔκτασις (éktasis) | bronchiectasis, telangiectasia |
| -ectomy | denotes a surgical operation or removal of a body part; resection, excision | Greek ἐκτομή (ektomḗ), excision | mastectomy |
| -edema | swelling | Greek οἴδημα (oídēma), swelling | lymphedema, lipedema |
| -emesis | vomiting condition | Greek ἕμεσις (hémesis) | hematemesis |
| -geusia | taste | Greek γεῦσις (geûsis) | ageusia, dysgeusia, hypergeusia, hypogeusia, parageusia |
| -iasis | condition, formation, or presence of | Latin -iasis, pathological condition or process; from Greek ἴασις (íasis), cure, repair, mend | mydriasis |
| -itis | inflammation | Greek -ῖτις (-îtis) fem. form of -ίτης (-ítēs), pertaining to, because it was used with the feminine noun νόσος (nósos, disease), thus -îtis nósos, disease of the, disease pertaining to | tonsillitis |
| isch- | restriction | Greek ἴσχω (ískhō), hold back, restrain | ischemia |
| -ismus | spasm, contraction | Greek -ισμός | hemiballismus |
| kal- | potassium | New Latin kalium, potassium | hyperkalemia |
| -malacia | softening | Greek μαλακία (malakía), soft, weak, self-indulgent | osteomalacia |
| meg(a)-, megal(o)-, -megaly | enlargement, million | Greek μέγᾰς (mégas), big, large, great, mighty | splenomegaly |
| meno- | month, menstrual cycle | Greek μήν (mḗn), month | menopause, menorrhagia |
| thromb(o)- | blood clot, clotting of blood | Greek θρόμβος (thrómbos), lump, piece, clot of blood | thrombus, thrombocytopenia |
| -oma(singular), -omata(plural) | tumor, mass, fluid collection | Greek -μα (-ma), suffix added to verbs to form nouns indicating the result of a process or action; cf. English -tion | sarcoma, teratoma, mesothelioma |
| -osis | a condition, disease, process or increase | Greek -ωσις (-ōsis), state, abnormal condition, action | Harlequin type ichthyosis, psychosis, osteoporosis, phagocytosis |
| ossi- | bone, bony | Latin os, bone | peripheral ossifying fibroma, fibrodysplasia ossificans progressiva |
| papul(o)- | small elevation or swelling in the skin, a pimple, swelling | Latin papula, pimple, pustle; a small elevation or swelling in the skin | papulation, papillitis |
| -paresis | slight paralysis | Greek πάρεσις (páresis) | hemiparesis |
| -penia | deficiency | Greek πενῐ́ᾱ, poverty, indigence | osteopenia |
| -pepsia | digestion or the digestive tract. | Greek πεπτός (peptós), cooked, digested < πέσσω (péssō), I boil, cook; digest | dyspepsia |
| -ptosis | falling, drooping, downward placement, prolapse | Greek πτῶσῐς (ptôsis), falling | apoptosis, nephroptosis |
| py- | pus | Greek πύον (púon), pus | pyometra |
| -phagia, -phage | eating or ingestion | Greek φαγία (phagía) eating < φᾰγεῖν (phageîn), to eat | trichophagia |
| -rrhage, -rrhagia | burst forth, rapid flow (of blood, usually) | Greek -ραγία (-ragía), to break, to burst | hemorrhage, menorrhagia |
| -rrhea(AmE), -rrhoea(BrE) | flowing, discharge | Greek ῥοίᾱ (rhoíā), flow, flux | galactorrhea, diarrhea |
| -rrhexis | rupture | Greek ῥῆξῐς (rhêxis), breaking, bursting, discharge | karyorrhexis |
| sarco- | muscular, flesh-like | Greek σάρξ (sárx), flesh | sarcoma, sarcoidosis |
| scler(o)-, -sclerosis | hard | Greek σκληρός (sklērós) | scleroderma, atherosclerosis, multiple sclerosis |
| tachy- | fast, irregularly fast | Greek τᾰχῠ́ς (takhús), fast, quickly | tachycardia, tachypnea |
| -stenosis | abnormal narrowing of a blood vessel or other tubular organ or structure | Greek στενός (stenós), narrow, short; + -σῐς (-sis), added to verb stems to form abstract nouns or nouns of action, result or process | restenosis, stenosis |
| stom-, stomat-, -stomy | mouth; an artificially created opening | Greek στόμᾰ, στοματ- (stóma, stomat-), mouth; New Latin stoma, opening | stomatognathic system, colostomy |
| -tomy, -otomy | act of cutting; incising, incision | Greek τομία (-tomía) | gastrotomy, phlebotomy |
| -tony | tension | Greek -τονία (-tonía) | Hypotonia |

== Pharmacology ==
- Anticholinergic
- Alpha blocker
- Beta blocker

== Clinical ==
=== Abbreviations ===
The publication of medical abbreviations for use in the journals published by the American Medical Association is dictated by the AMA Manual of Style is the style guide of the American Medical Association.

Periods are generally not used. Plurals for medical acronyms are represented by affixes a lowercase s with no apostrophe. Arrows may also be used to indicate elevation (↑), diminution (↓), and causation (→, ←).

Examples
| Abb | Full name |
| ad lib | as desired (from Latin ad libitum) |
| bd, bid | 2 times a day |
| GU | genitourinary |
| OD | once daily (from Latin omne in die) |
| OD | right eye (from Latin oculus dexter) |
| OD | overdose |
| OD | occupational disease |
| s̅ | without (from Latin sine) |

==== Medical slang ====
Medical slang such as, "TTFO", meaning "told to fuck off", may be used on a patient's chart in an informal and derogatory manner.

=== Diagnosis ===
- Medical diagnosis
- Differential diagnosis

=== Symptomatology ===
- Signs and symptoms

=== Transgender anatomy ===
Although some medical authorities recommend mirroring the terminology transgender people use to describe their own genitals, such usage may feel uncomfortable and intimate to some transgender people, who prefer to use different terms in medical contexts than they would in personal settings. At the same time, patients may also be uncomfortable with anatomical terms they perceive as gendered.

Specialists recommend being open to using sex-neutral terms for organs, such as external genitals or lateral folds for the labia, internal reproductive organs for the uterus and ovaries, and chest for the breasts.

Style guides such as the Publication Manual of the American Psychological Association and AMA Manual of Style recommend using gender-neutral language and distinguishing between gender and biological sex, but do not give guidance on specific anatomical terminology.

=== Mnemonics ===
Surveys of medical students show that approximately 20% use medical mnemonics.

== History ==
The earliest known glossaries of medical terms were discovered on Egyptian papyrus authored around 1600 B.C. Other precursors to modern medical dictionaries include lists of terms compiled from the Hippocratic Corpus in the first century AD. The Synonyma Simonis Genuensis (the Synonyms of Simon of Genoa), attributed to the physician to Pope Nicholas IV in the year 1288, was printed by Antonius Zarotus at Milan in 1473. Referring to a copy held in the library of the College of Physicians of Philadelphia, Henry wrote in 1905 that "It is the first edition of the first medical dictionary." However, this claim is disputed as the composition only included lists of herbs and drugs.

At the beginning of the Renaissance, Italian universities began teaching a broader range of courses, such as law and medicine, whilst universities in northern Europe were still dominated by theology and related topics. All European universities required Latin proficiency for admission. Latin was the dominant language of university education, where rules were enforced against the use of vernacular languages. Lectures and debates took place in Latin, and writing was in Latin, across the curriculum.

Latin dominated topics of international academic and scientific interest, especially at the level of abstract thought addressed to other specialists. To begin with, knowledge was already transmitted through Latin and it maintained specialised vocabularies not found in vernacular languages. By the early modern period, Neo-Latin had become the lingua franca of science, medicine, legal discourse, theology, and education in Europe. Over time, the use of Latin continued where international communication with specialist audiences was paramount. Later, where some of the discourse moved to French, English or German, translations into Latin would allow texts to cross language boundaries, while authors in countries with much smaller language populations or less known languages would tend to continue to compose in Latin.

Latin's dominance over medicine began to change in the late seventeenth century, as philosophers and others began to write in their native language first, afterwards translating into Latin for international audiences. In the early part of the 1700s, Latin was still making a significant contribution to academic publishing, but was no longer dominant.

Examples of modern medical dictionaries include Mosby's Dictionary of Medicine, Nursing & Health Professions, Stedman's, Taber's, and Dorland's.

== See also ==
- Glossary of medicine
- Glossary of scientific naming
- List of deprecated terms for diseases
- List of Greek and Latin roots in English

== Works cited ==
- Bertok L, Chow D (2005). Bertok L, Chow D (eds.). Natural Immunity. Vol. 5 (1st ed.). Elsevier Science. ISBN 978-0-44451-755-5.
- Breinstrup, Thomas (2006). "Un revolution in le mundo scientific" [A revolution in the scientific world]. Historia de interlingua (in Interlingua). Archived from the original on 2019-04-27.
- Chung, Kyung Won (2005). Gross Anatomy (Board Review). Lippincott Williams & Wilkins. ISBN 0-7817-5309-0.
- Cook, Chad E. (2012). Orthopedic Manual Therapy: An Evidence Based Approach (2nd ed.). Upper Saddle River, NJ: Pearson Education. ISBN 978-0-13-802173-3.
- Breinstrup, Th.; Stenström, Ingvar; Olsson, Jesper, eds. (2007) [2001]. "Biographias: Ingvar Stenström". Interlingua (in Interlingua). Archived from the original on 2019-04-26.
- Dinour, Lauren M. (2019). "Speaking Out on 'Breastfeeding' Terminology: Recommendations for Gender-Inclusive Language in Research and Reporting". Breastfeeding Medicine. 14 (8). Mary Ann Liebert: 523–532. doi:10.1089/bfm.2019.0110. PMID 31364867.
- Fielding, Lucie (2021). Trans Sex: Clinical Approaches to Trans Sexualities and Erotic Embodiments. New York: Routledge. ISBN 978-0-429-31829-0.
  - Edwards, Heather. "Anatomy Talk". pp. 165–168.
- Gopsill, Frank Peter (1990). International languages: a matter for Interlingua. Sheffield, England: British Interlingua Society. ISBN 0-9511695-6-4. OCLC 27813762.
- Gopsill, Frank Peter (1994). Interlingua today: A course for beginners. Sheffield, England: British Interlingua Society. ISBN 978-1-898017-01-1.
- Gopsill, Frank Peter; Sexton, Brian (2006) [2001]. "Le natura, si – un schema, no". Historia de interlingua (in Interlingua). Archived from the original on 2022-04-12.
- Hill-Meyer, Tobi; Scarborough, Dean (2014). "Sexuality". In Erickson-Schroth, Laura (ed.). Trans Bodies, Trans Selves: A Resource for the Transgender Community (1st ed.). Oxford UP. ISBN 978-0-19-932535-1. OCLC 944726648.
- Houglum, Peggy A.; Bertoli, Dolores B. (2012). Brunnstrom's Clinical Kinesiology. F. A. Davis Company. ISBN 978-0-8036-2352-1.
- Janeway CA, Travers P, Walport M (2001). "Effector mechanisms in allergic reactions". Immunobiology (5th ed.). Garland Science.
- Janeway CA (2005). Immunobiology (6th ed.). Garland Science. ISBN 0-443-07310-4.
- Kendall, Florence Peterson; et al. (2005). Muscles : testing and function with posture and pain (5th ed.). Baltimore, MD: Lippincott Williams & Wilkins. ISBN 0-7817-4780-5.
- Knight, Sarah; Tilg, Stefan, eds. (2015). The Oxford Handbook of Neo-Latin. New York: Oxford University Press. ISBN 978-0-19-088699-8. OL 28648475M.
- Krishnaswamy G, Ajitawi O, Chi DS (2006). "The human mast cell: an overview". Mast Cells. Methods in Molecular Biology. Vol. 315. pp. 13–34. doi:10.1385/1-59259-967-2:013. ISBN 1-59259-967-2. PMID 16110146.
- McArthur, Tom (ed.): The Oxford Companion to the English Language, (Oxford University Press, 1992). ISBN 0-19-214183-X
- Murphy K, Weaver C (2016). Immunobiology (9 ed.). Garland Science. ISBN 978-0-8153-4505-3.
- Plag, Ingo "Word-Formation in English", Cambridge University Press, 2003, ISBN à0521525632, 9780521525633
- Rider, Nic G.; Caso, Taymy J.; Czech, Spencer; Karasic, Dan H. (2022). "Terminology in Transgender Medicine". In van Trotsenburg, Mick; Luikenaar, Rixt A. C.; Meriggiola, Maria Cristina (eds.). Context, Principles and Practice of TransGynecology: Managing Transgender Patients in ObGyn Practice. Cambridge UP. doi:10.1017/9781108899987. ISBN 978-1-108-89998-7.
- Ragosta, Sachiko; Obedin-Maliver, Juno; Fix, Laura; Stoeffler, Ari; Hastings, Jen; Capriotti, Matthew R.; Flentje, Annesa; Lubensky, Micah E.; Lunn, Mitchell R.; Moseson, Heidi (1 September 2021). "From 'Shark-Week' to 'Mangina': An Analysis of Words Used by People of Marginalized Sexual Orientations and/or Gender Identities to Replace Common Sexual and Reproductive Health Terms". Health Equity. 5 (1). Mary Ann Liebert: 707–717. doi:10.1089/heq.2021.0022. PMC 8665782. PMID 34909540. This article incorporates text from this free content work. Licensed under CC-BY 4.0.
- Rajalingam R (2012). "Overview of the Killer Cell Immunoglobulin-Like Receptor System". Immunogenetics. Methods in Molecular Biology. Vol. 882. pp. 391–414. doi:10.1007/978-1-61779-842-9_23. ISBN 978-1-61779-841-2. PMID 22665247.
- Saladin, Kenneth S. (2010). Anatomy & Physiology The Unity of Form and Function (5th ed.). McGraw Hill. ISBN 978-0077361358.
- Simpson, John A.; Weiner, Edmung (1989). The Oxford English Dictionary. Oxford: Clarendon Press. ISBN 9780198611868.
- Sompayrac L (2019). How the immune system works. Hoboken, NJ: Wiley-Blackwell. ISBN 978-1-119-54212-4. OCLC 1083261548.
- Stvrtinová V, Jakubovský J, Hulín I (1995). Pathophysiology: Principles of Disease. Computing Centre, Slovak Academy of Sciences: Academic Electronic Press.
- Swartz, Mark H. (2010). Textbook of Physical Diagnosis: History and Examination (6th ed.). Saunders/Elsevier. ISBN 978-1-4160-6203-5.
- Concise Oxford Companion to the English Language 1998 entries on classical compound and combining form
- Taber, Clarence Wilbur; Thomas, Clayton L.; Venes, Donald (2001). Taber's cyclopedic medical dictionary (Ed. 19, illustrated in full color ed.). Philadelphia: F.A.Davis Co. ISBN 0-8036-0655-9. ISSN 1065-1357.
- Waquet, Françoise (2001). Latin, or the Empire of a Sign: From the Sixteenth to the Twentieth Centuries. Translated by John Howe. Verso. ISBN 1859844022.
