= Flentje =

Flentje is a surname. Notable people with the surname include:

- Annesa Flentje (fl. 2000), American clinical psychologist
- H. Edward Flentje (born 1942), American educator

== See also ==
- Ernst Flentje House, Cambridge, Massachusetts
