= Stedman's Medical Dictionary =

Medical dictionary

Stedman's Medical Dictionary is a medical dictionary developed for medical students, physicians, researchers, and medical language specialists. Entries include medical terms, abbreviations, acronyms, measurements, and more. Pronunciation and word etymology (showing mostly Latin and Greek prefixes and roots) are provided with most definitions.

== History ==
Stedman's Medical Dictionary was first produced as Dunglison's New Dictionary of Medical Science and Literature in 1833 by Robley Dunglison. In 1903, Thomas Lathrop Stedman became the editor of the medical dictionary and made thorough revisions to the text. The first edition of Stedman's Medical Dictionary was published in 1911. Additional versions include Stedman's Medical Dictionary for the Health Professions and Nursing, Stedman's Medical Abbreviations, Acronyms & Symbols, Stedman's Pocket Medical Dictionary, and Stedman's Medical Dictionary for the Dental Professions.

== Editions ==
As of 2020, the current edition is the 28th Edition, published in 2005. This edition added over 5,000 new terms and definitions to total to more than 107,000 entries. It succeeds the 27th Edition, which was published in 2000.

== Areas of coverage ==
- Athletic training
- Embryology
- Exercise science
- Health information management
- Massage therapy
- Medical assisting
- Medical transcription
- Occupational therapy
- Nursing
- Pharmacy and pharmacy technology
- Weapons of mass destruction / mass casualty / bioterrorism
