= Thomas Lathrop Stedman =

American physician (1853–1938)

Thomas Lathrop Stedman, M.D. (1853-1938) was an early American medical doctor and editor of the Medical Record starting in 1890.

== Biography ==
He was born in Cincinnati, Ohio, on October 11, 1853. He received bachelor's and master's degrees from Trinity College, and studied medicine at the College of Physicians and Surgeons, graduating in 1877. He was a fellow of the American Medical Association.

He became an editor of the Medical Record starting in 1890. In 1903 he became editor of Dunglison's New Dictionary of Medical Science and Literature. It became Stedman's Medical Dictionary for the 1911 edition.

He died May 16, 1938, in New York City.
