= Medical Record (journal) =

Defunct medical journal published in New York City

- Discipline: General medical
- Language: English

Publication details
- History: 1866–?

Standard abbreviations
- ISO 4: Med. Rec.

The Medical Record: A Weekly Journal of Medicine and Surgery was an American medical journal founded in 1866 by George Frederick Shrady, Sr., who was its first editor-in-chief. Thomas Lathrop Stedman became assistant editor in 1890 and editor-in-chief in 1897.

It was published in New York City. It was later published by the Washington Institute of Medicine.

Many issues of Medical Record are now in the public domain and available through the Google Books project.

Started in 1866, the Medical Record has for forty-six years held the first place among medical weeklies in America. Impartial, judicial, and scientific, its single aim has been to furnish to the Medical Profession an independent, enterprising, and progressive medical newspaper conserving the best interests of the profession.

The Medical Record believes that the proper scope of a medical newspaper is all that concerns the Science and Practice of Medicine and Surgery, and all that concerns the Physician and Surgeon. It is conducted on the broadest lines, sparing no expense in the employment of its Editorial Staff, in collecting news, in maintaining correspondents in various parts of the world, and in securing exclusive reports of meetings by cable and telegraph.

The Medical Record is independent of the control of any group of individuals or of any personal policy. It is controlled by the best judgment that long experience of the needs of the better class of American physicians can give. Such experience teaches that the enlightened sentiment of the Profession is the only safe guide in this respect.

— , 1912 Advertisement for Medical Record
