= List of elevators of the human body =

Elevation is an anatomical term of motion describing movement in a superior direction towards the head and away from the feet. It is the opposite of depression.

== Muscles ==
- elevation of the scapula at the shoulders (e.g. shrugging shoulders) include:
  - Levator scapulae muscle
  - Rhomboid major muscle and Rhomboid minor muscle
  - Trapezius muscle
- elevation of the ribs
  - Pectoralis minor muscle
  - Scalene muscles
- mandible
  - Medial pterygoid muscle
- upper lip
  - Levator labii superioris
- upper lip and wing of nose
  - Levator labii superioris alaeque nasi muscle
- angle of mouth
  - Levator anguli oris
- upper eyelid
  - Levator palpebrae superioris muscle
- eyeball
  - Superior rectus muscle
