= Ernst Flentje House =

Historic house in Massachusetts, United States

- U.S. National Register of Historic Places
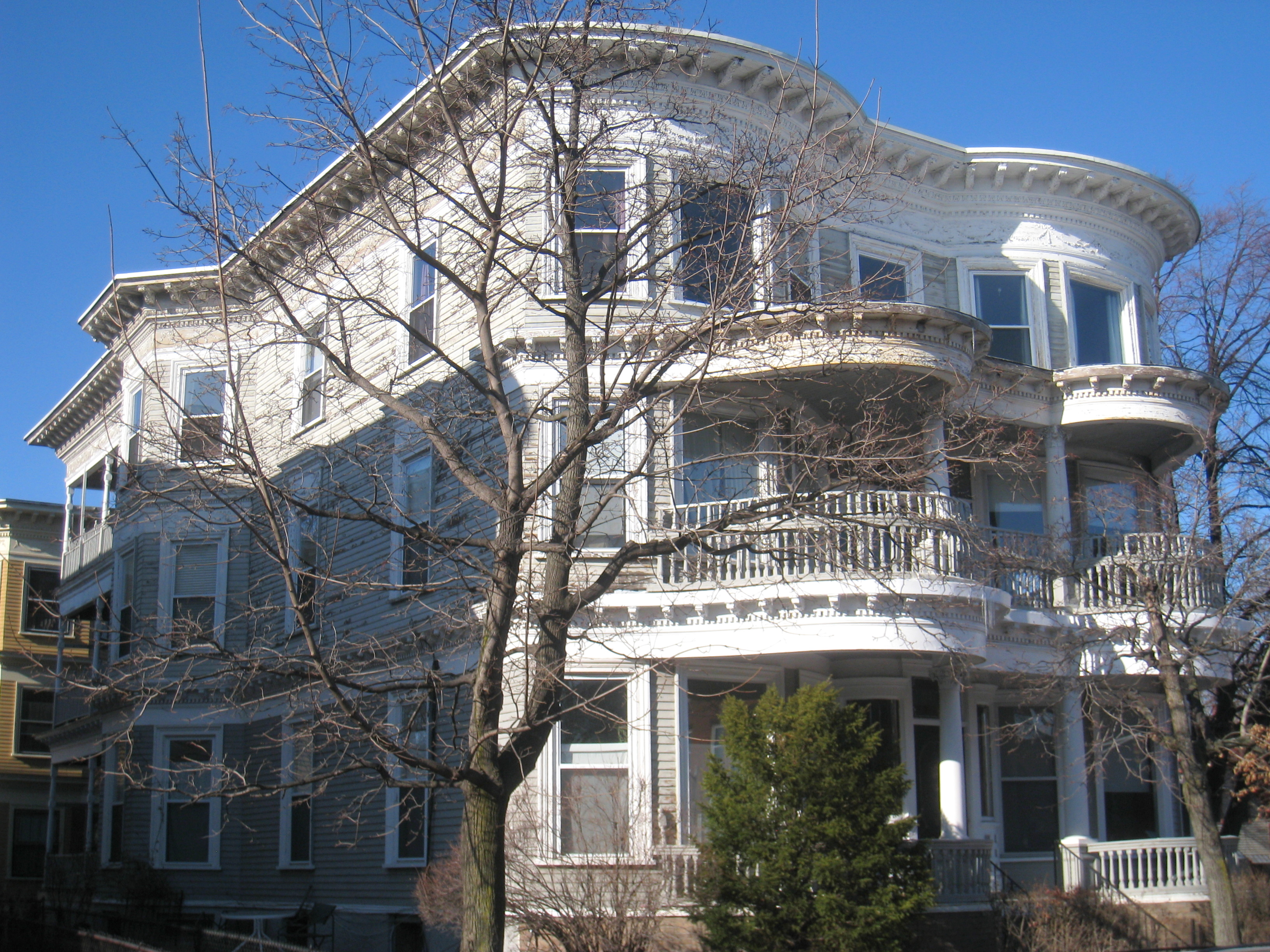

- Location within Massachusetts Location within the United States
- Location: Cambridge, Massachusetts
- Coordinates: 42°21′32.8″N 71°06′41.2″W
- Built: 1866
- Architectural style: Colonial Revival, Second Empire
- MPS: Cambridge MRA
- NRHP reference No.: 83000800
- Added to NRHP: June 30, 1983

The Ernst Flentje House is an historic house at 129 Magazine Street in Cambridge, Massachusetts. This three story wood frame apartment house exhibits the adaptive reuse of buildings. It was built in 1866 as a Second Empire single family residence with a mansard roof. In 1900 it was restyled by Ernst Flentje and converted into a three unit apartment house. It is one of the most exuberantly decorated triple deckers in the city.

The house was listed on the National Register of Historic Places in 1983.

== See also ==
- National Register of Historic Places listings in Cambridge, Massachusetts
