= Mosby's Dictionary of Medicine, Nursing & Health Professions =

Dictionary of health-related topics

- 11th edition
- Author: O'Toole, Marie T. (editor)
- Language: English (separate versions of several English language localizations)
- Genre: Medical, Dictionaries & Terminology
- Publisher: Mosby imprint of Elsevier
- Publication place: United States of America
- Media type: Print (hardcover)

Mosby's Dictionary of Medicine, Nursing & Health Professions is a dictionary of health-related topics. The 11th edition, published in 2021, contains 2,080 pages and 2,450 illustrations. It includes some encyclopaedic definitions and 12 appendixes containing reference information. Earlier versions are titled Mosby's Medical, Nursing & Allied Health Dictionary.

In 2024, it was designated an "Essential Purchase" for small medical libraries by Doody’s Core Titles.
