= Annesa Flentje =

American clinical psychologist

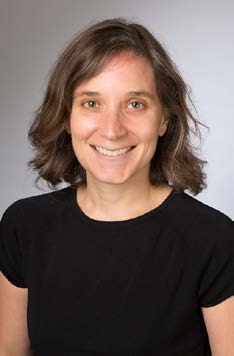
- Other name: Annesa Flentje Santa
- Education: University of Montana (BA, MA, PhD); Capella University (MS)
- Scientific career
- Fields: Health disparities, LGBT community, clinical psychology
- Workplaces: UCSF School of Nursing
- Academic advisors: Bryan Cochran

Annesa M. Flentje is an American clinical psychologist specializing in reducing health disparities in LGBT community. She is a professor at Stanford University.

== Education ==
Flentje completed a B.A. at University of Montana (UM) in 2000. She earned a M.S. at Capella University in 2003.

Flentje completed a M.A. in clinical psychology at UM in 2006. Her graduate thesis was titled, Effects of Different Types of Drinking and Driving PSAs on Persons with Varying Levels of Drinking and Driving Experience. Her academic advisor was Bryan Cochran.

In 2012, Flentje earned a Ph.D. in clinical psychology at UM. She completed a postdoctoral fellowship in drug abuse treatment services research at the University of California, San Francisco.

== Career and research ==
Flentje is a professor at Stanford University. She is a clinical psychologist who focuses on reducing health disparities in the LGBT community.

Her research has targeted multiple ways to reduce these disparities, including prevention, increasing the visibility of sexual and gender minorities in research, and improving mental health and substance abuse services for sexual and gender minorities. Her current research is identifying the relationship between minority stress, substance use, and biological functioning at the molecular level (i.e., gene expression and DNA methylation). She has developed an individually delivered intervention to reduce minority stress among sexual minority men and is investigating it as a means to reduce substance use and improve the physical and mental health of sexual minority people.

Flentje is a co-director of The PRIDE Study, a prospective, national, longitudinal study of the health of sexual and gender minority individuals within the United States that has enrolled more than 32,000 sexual and gender minority people to date.

== Awards and honors ==
Flentje was an early-stage investigator awardee at the 2018 National Institutes of Health Sexual and Gender Minority Research Investigator Awards Program.
