= Ventral body cavity =

Cavity of the human anterior

Human body cavities: Ventral body cavity is to the right

The ventral body cavity is a body cavity in the anterior aspect of the human body, comprising the thoracic cavity and abdominopelvic cavity. The abdominopelvic cavity is further divided into the abdominal cavity and pelvic cavity, but there is no physical barrier between the two. The abdominal cavity contains the bulk of the gastrointestinal tract, the spleen and the kidneys. The pelvic cavity contains the urinary bladder, internal reproductive organs, and rectum.

There are two methods for dividing the abdominopelvic cavity. The clinical method, used by physicians and nurses, utilizes four sections called quadrants. They are the right upper quadrant, the left upper quadrant, the right lower quadrant, and the left lower quadrant. The directional terms refer to the model's right and left, not the viewer's. Clinicians use the quadrant method because in reality, organs are mobile and move around when the patient is in different positions.

The second method for dividing the abdominopelvic cavity is preferred by anatomists. This method divides the cavity into nine regions. The regions are the left and right hypochondriac regions, so named because they lie under the ribs; the epigastric region which is approximately where the stomach is located between the hypochondriac regions; the right and left lumbar regions which flank the umbilical region (which surrounds the umbilicus, or belly button), the right and left iliac and inguinal regions which are where the hips are, and the hypogastric/pubic region, which lies between the hips.

The thoracic cavity is separated from the abdominopelvic cavity by the diaphragm. The thoracic cavity is further separated into the pleural cavity which contains the lungs and the superior mediastinum which includes the pericardial (heart) cavity.

The organs within the ventral body cavity are called the viscera.

== Additional images ==
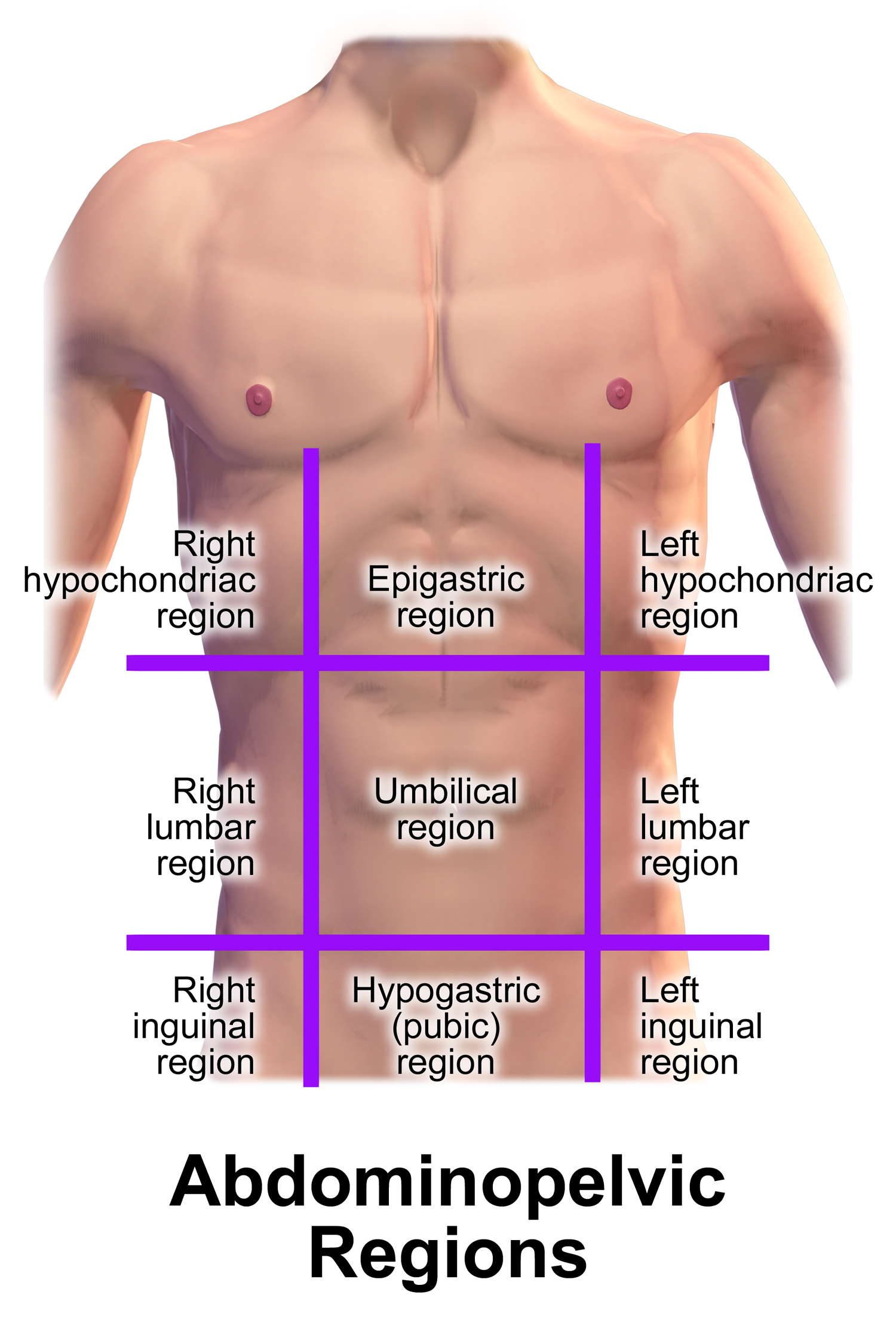
Abdominopelvic regions

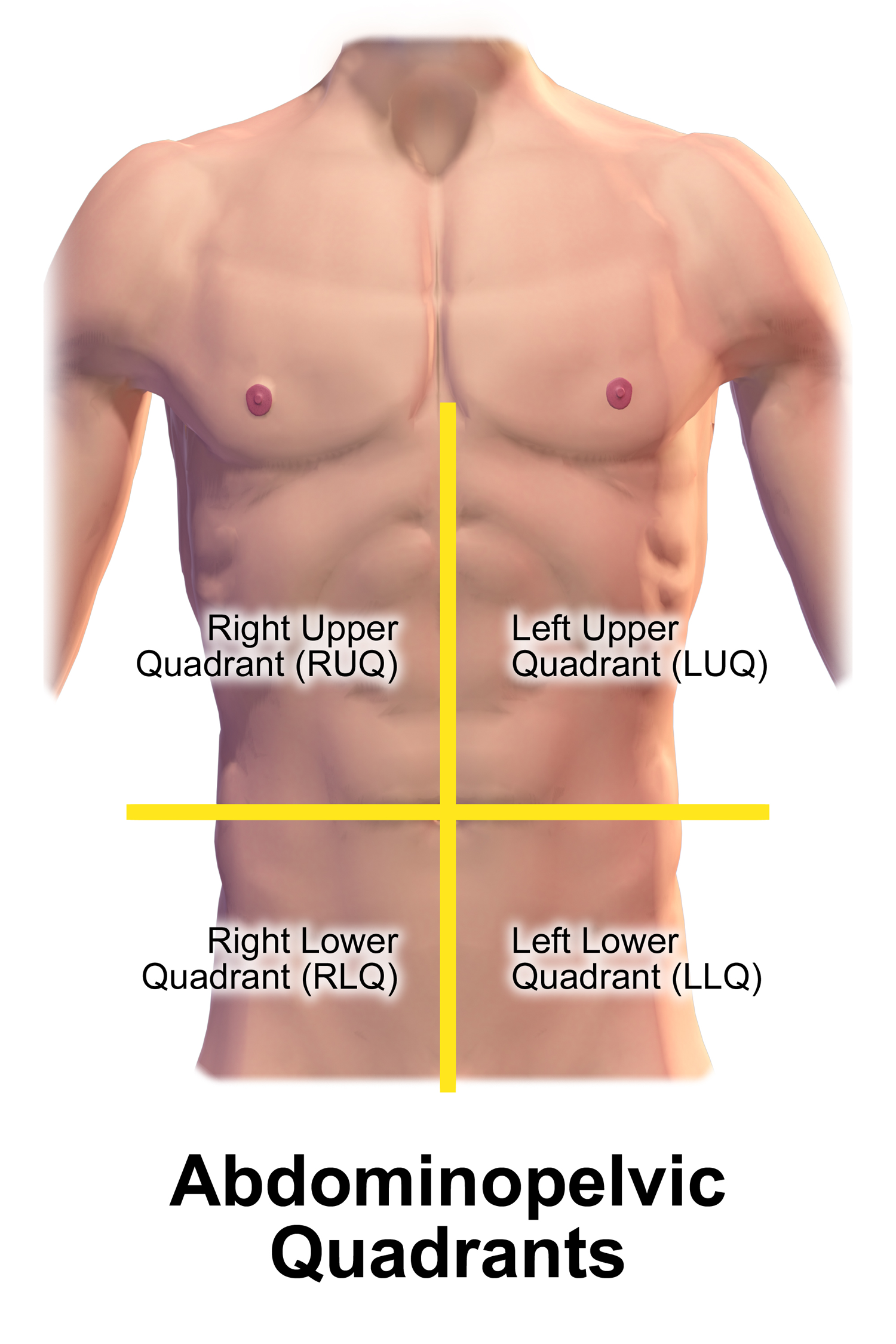
Abdominopelvic quadrants

== See also ==
- Dorsal body cavity
