= List of human anatomical regions =

This illustration, labeled "Regions of the human body", shows anterior and posterior views of the body.

== Regions ==
- The cranial region includes the upper part of the head while the
- facial region includes the lower half of the head beginning below the ears.
- The forehead is referred to as the frontal region.
- The eyes are referred to as the orbital or ocular region.
- The cheeks are referred to as the buccal region.
- The ears are referred to as the auricle or otic region.
- The nose is referred to as the nasal region.
- The mouth is referred to as the oral region.
- The chin is referred to as the mental region.
- The neck is referred to as the cervical region.

The trunk of the body contains, from superior to inferior,

- the thoracic region encompassing the chest
- the mammary region encompassing each breast
- the sternal region encompassing the sternum
- the abdominal region encompassing the stomach area
- the umbilical region is located around the navel
- the coxal region (hip region) encompassing the lateral (side) of hips
- the pubic region encompassing the area above the genitals.

The pelvis and legs contain, from superior to inferior,

- the inguinal or groin region between the thigh and the abdomen,
- the pubic region surrounding the genitals,
- the femoral region encompassing the thighs,
- the patellar region encompassing the front of the knee,
- the crural region encompassing the lower leg, between the knee and ankle,
- the fibular region encompassing the outside of the lower leg,
- the tarsal region encompassing the ankle,
- the pedal region encompassing the foot
- the digital/phalangeal region encompassing the toes.
- The great toe is referred to as the hallux.

The regions of the upper limbs, from superior to inferior, are

- the axillary region encompassing the armpit,
- the brachial region encompassing the upper arm,
- the antecubital region encompassing the front of the elbow,
- the antebrachial region encompassing the forearm,
- the carpal region encompassing the wrist,
- the palmar region encompassing the palm,
- the digital/phalangeal region encompassing the fingers.
- The thumb is referred to as the pollex.

The posterior view contains, from superior to inferior,

- the cervical region encompassing the neck,
- the scapular region encompassing the scapulae and the area around,
- the dorsal region encompassing the upper back
- the lumbar region encompassing the lower back.
- the sacral region occurring at the end of the spine, directly above the buttocks.

The regions of the back of the arms, from superior to inferior, include

- the cervical region encompassing the neck,
- the acromial region encompassing the shoulder,
- the brachial region encompassing the upper arm,
- the olecranal region encompassing the back of the elbow,
- the antebrachial region encompasses the forearm, front and back
- and the manual or manus region encompassing the back of the hand.

The posterior regions of the legs, from superior to inferior, include

- the gluteal region encompassing the buttocks,
- the femoral region encompassing the thigh,
- the popliteal region encompassing the back of the knee,
- the sural region encompassing the back of the lower leg,
- the calcaneal region encompassing the heel,
- the plantar region encompassing the sole of the foot.

Some regions are combined into larger regions. These include the trunk, which is a combination of the thoracic, mammary, abdominal, navel, and coxal regions. The cephalic region is a combination of all of the head regions. The upper limb region is a combination of all of the arm regions. The lower limb region is a combination of all of the leg regions.

== Deprecated or older regions ==
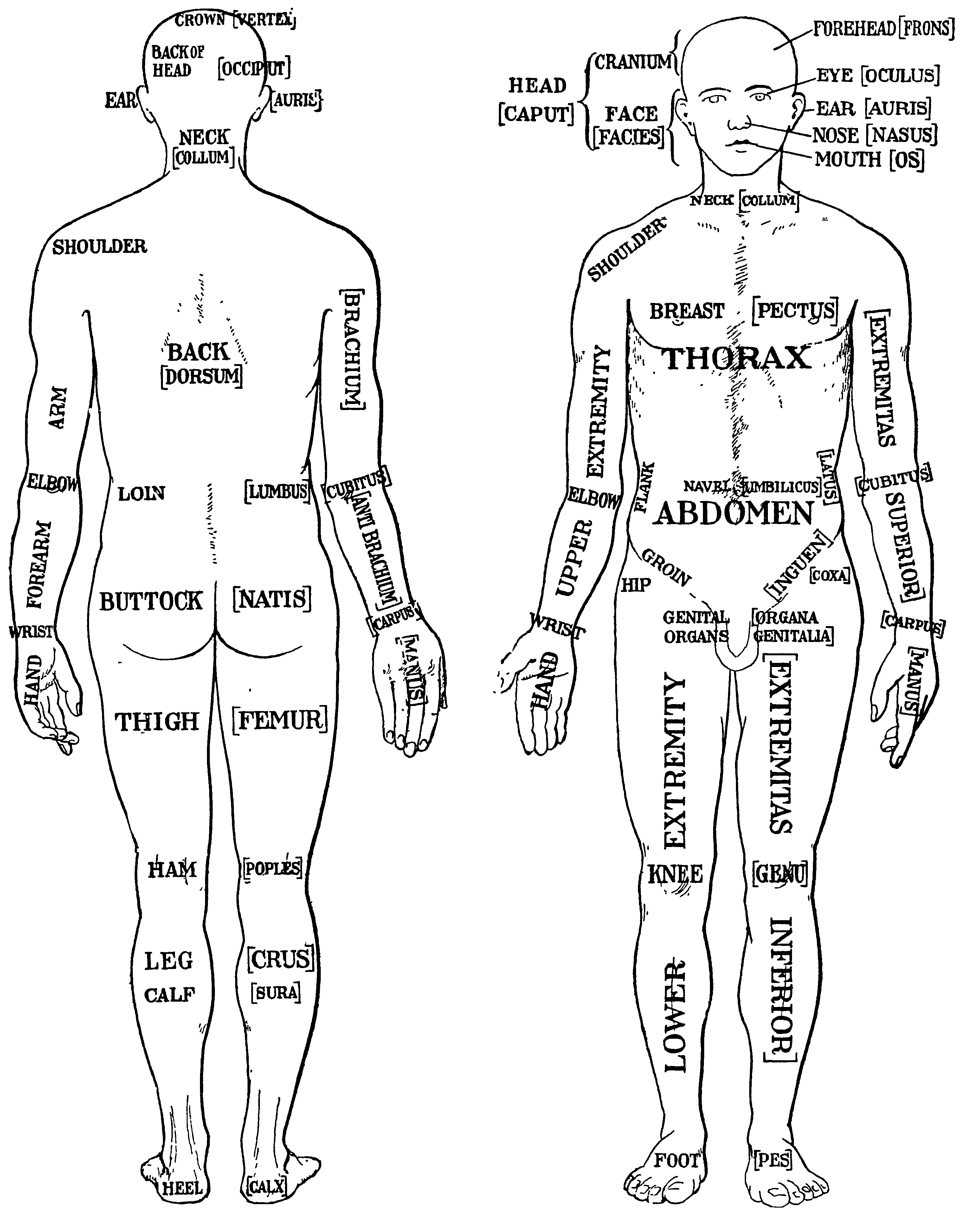
Older set of terminology shown in Parts of the Human Body: Posterior and Anterior View from the 1933 edition of Sir Henry Morris' Human Anatomy

Many of these terms are medical latin terms that have fallen into disuse.

Front:

- Frons - forehead
- Facies - face
- Pectus - breast
- Latus - flank
- Coxa - hip
- Genu - knee
- Pes - foot

Back:

- Vertex - Crown (Note: Still used to describe the head of a fetus.)
- Occiput - back of head
- Collum - neck
- Dorsum - back (Note: No longer used commonly as an anatomical region, but still used as a term to describe relative location)
- Lumbus - loin
- Natis - buttock
- Calx - heel

== See also ==
- Anatomical terms of location
- Human anatomical terms
- Human anatomy
- Human brain
