= Coactivation =

Coactivation may mean:

- Coactivation (Transcription), a process by which RNA transcription is increased
- Muscle coactivation, a phenomenon in which a muscle is activated coordinately with another muscle
