= Solberge Hall =

Building in North Yorkshire, England

Coordinates: 54°17′47.4″N 1°27′20.7″W

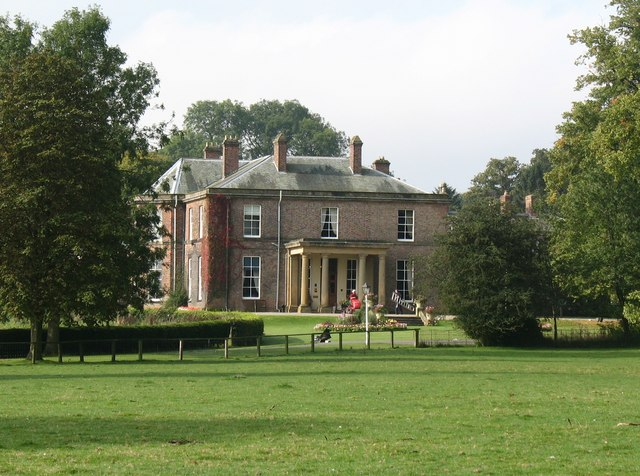
Solberge Hall

Solberge Hall is near Northallerton in North Yorkshire, England. The house is Georgian of historical significance. It was built in 1824 by John Hutton, a local landowner and remained in the Hutton family for about one hundred years until it was purchased by Benjamin Talbot the inventor. After a multi-million pound refurbishment and restoration programme, Solberge Hall is now a wedding and events venue set in a private estate in North Yorkshire.

== The Hutton family ==
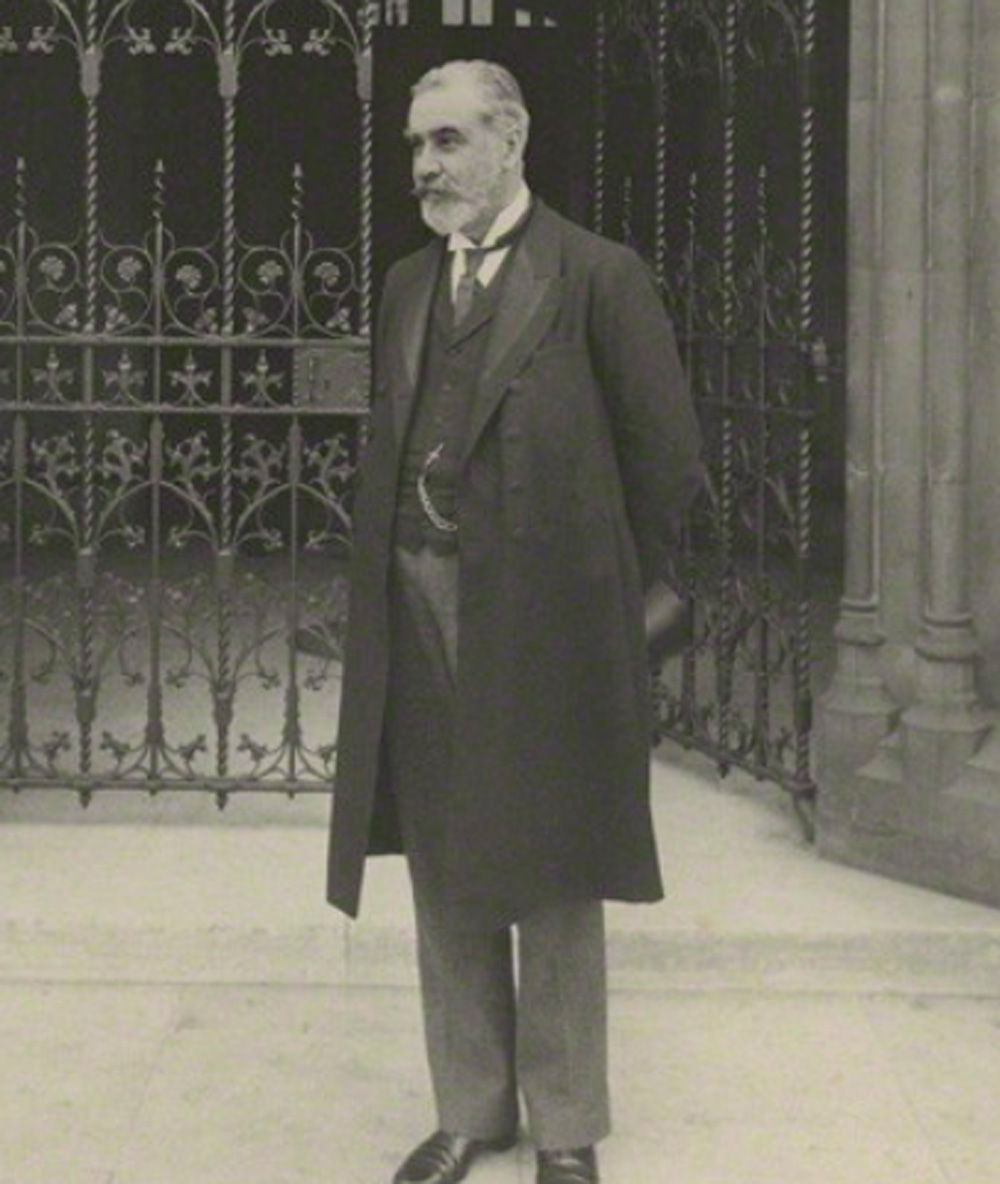
John Hutton (1847–1921)

John Hutton (1794–1857) was born in 1794 in Newby Wiske. His father was Robert Hutton and his mother was Margaret Squire. The Hutton family had purchased Sober Gate which is adjacent to Solberge Hall in 1684. In 1812 when John was eight years old, his father died, leaving him and his sister Margaret in the care of their mother at Sober Gate. John inherited the property when he came of age, and in 1821 he bought Solberge Manor from George Osbaldeston, the cricketer. In 1824, he built Solberge Hall, which for many years was called Sowber Hill. John lived with his sister Margaret until her death at the age of 36 in 1833. He erected an elaborate memorial to her in St Michael's Church in North Otterington. It was considered to be an artistic work and the British Museum holds an illustration of the monument.

In 1845 at the age of 50, Hutton married Caroline Robson, the daughter of Thomas Robson of Holtby Hall. The couple had two sons. When John died in 1857, he was described in the York Herald as being "in all respects a real English country gentleman. He was applauded for his innovative agricultural activities, as some of his experiments in crop growing and animal feeding were adopted by others and assisted in production.

The eldest son, John Hutton (1847–1921), inherited Solberge Hall. He was educated at Eton and Oxford University. In 1870, he married Caroline Shore, the daughter of Charles John Shore, 2nd Baron Teignmouth. They had a son, John, who became a Member of Parliament. He also served on North Riding County Council.

In 1913 John put Solberge Hall on the market and Benjamin Talbot bought the property

== Benjamin Talbot ==
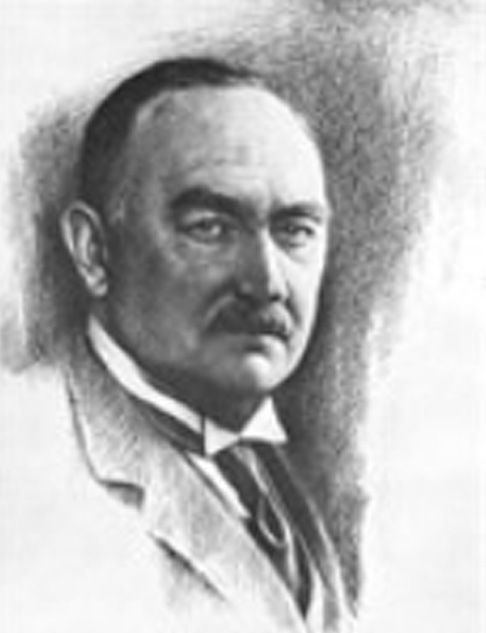
Benjamin Talbot

Benjamin Talbot, inventor and steel company manager, moved into Solberge Hall in about 1913. The following year he became a magistrate for the North Riding. Talbot (1864–1947) was born in 1864 at Hadley in Shropshire. He was the second son of Benjamin Talbot who owned the Castle Ironworks in Wellington. After he finished school he worked in his father's ironworks. In 1884 he married Frances Ann Chapman and moved to USA for ten years where he invented new techniques in the production of steel.

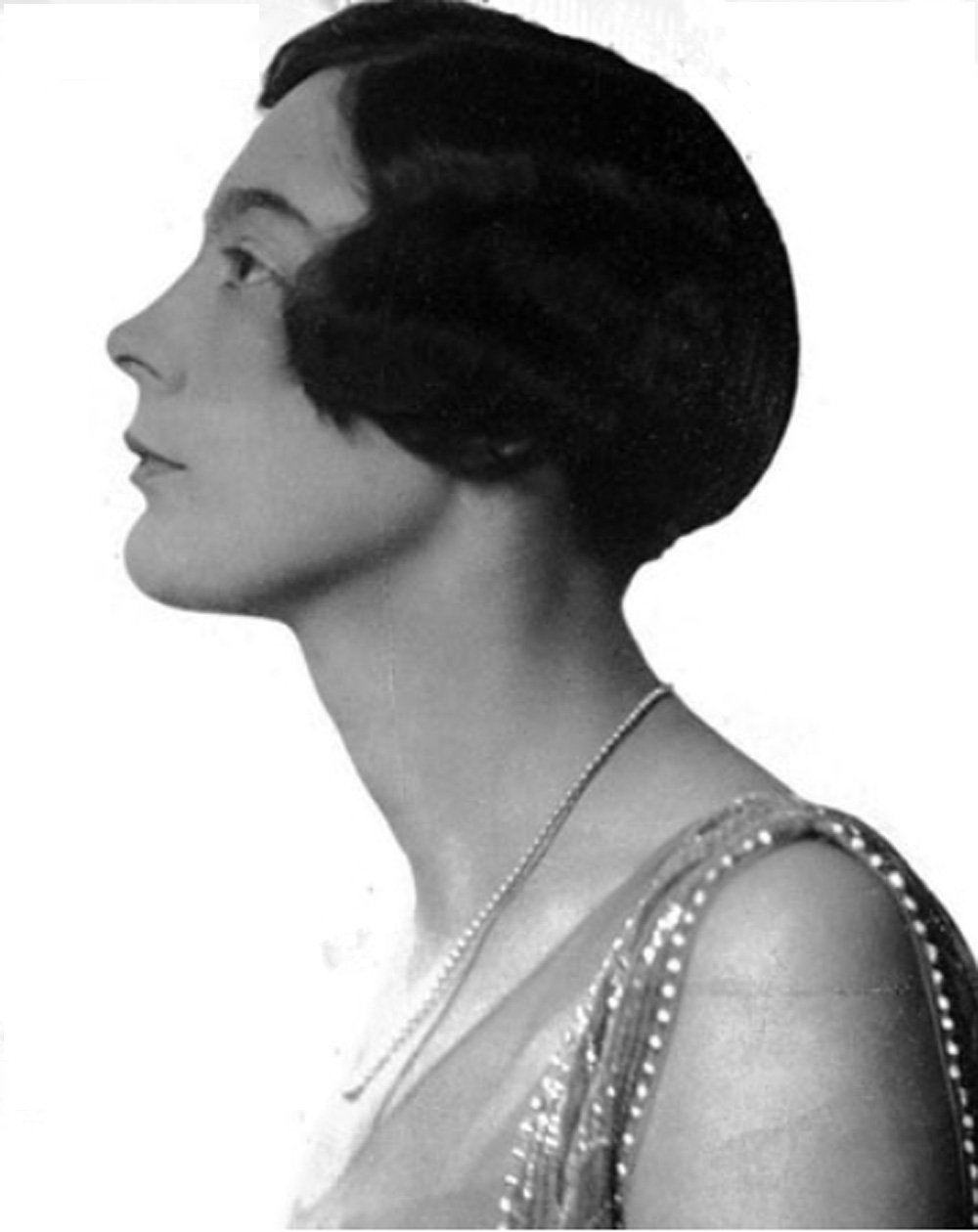
Viva Talbot, Benjamin Talbot's daughter

Talbot returned to England in 1900 and his new inventions were introduced into some of the English Steel Companies. In 1907 he became managing director of Cargo Fleet Iron Company and transformed it into a profitable firm. He was a director of several other steel companies. For his inventions he was awarded the Bessemer gold medal of the Iron and Steel Institute, the Elliott Cresson gold medal, and the John Scott medal of the Franklin Institute. In 1928 he was elected president of the Iron and Steel Institute and served as president of the National Federation of Iron and Steel Manufacturers.

Talbot had four children one of whom was Viva Talbot. She was 13 when she came to Solberge Hall where she lived with her parents until she married Sir Thomas Moore Nussey, son of Sir Thomas Willans Nussey, 1st Baronet in 1941 at the age of 41. She was a notable artist and was given an exhibition of her woodcuts depicting her father's steelworks.

Benjamin Talbot died in 1947 and the following year Solberge Hall was sold. It is now owned and operated by the Wharfedale Group.
