= Dorsal body cavity =

Main cavity in the human body

Body cavities: Dorsal body cavity is to the left.

The dorsal body cavity is located along the dorsal (posterior) surface of the human body, where it is subdivided into the cranial cavity housing the brain and the spinal cavity housing the spinal cord. The brain and spinal cord make up the central nervous system. The two cavities are continuous with one another. The covering and protective membranes for the dorsal body cavity are the meninges.

It is one of the two main body cavities, along with the ventral body cavity.
