= Nussey baronets =

Extinct baronetcy in the Baronetage of the United Kingdom

The Nussey Baronetcy, of Rushwood Hall in the County of York, was a title in the Baronetage of the United Kingdom. It was created on 26 July 1909 for Thomas Willans Nussey, Member of Parliament for Pontefract from 1893 to 1910.

The 2nd Baronet married Viva Frances Talbot (1900–1983), daughter of Benjamin Talbot, of Solberge Hall in 1941. The title became extinct on his death in 1971.

== Nussey baronets, of Rushwood Hall (1909) ==
- Sir Thomas Willans Nussey, 1st Baronet (1868–1947)
- Sir Thomas Moore Nussey, 2nd Baronet (1898–1971), left no heir.

Baronetage of the United Kingdom
| Preceded by Morris baronets | Nussey baronets of Rushwood Hall; 26 July 1909 | Succeeded by Scott baronets |
