= Willans Nussey =

British politician

Sir Willans Nussey DL

Member of Parliament for Pontefract
- In office 1893–1910

Personal details
- Born: 12 October 1868 Thorner, West Riding of Yorkshire
- Died: 12 October 1947 (aged 79) Sutton Howgrave, Bedale
- Party: Liberal Party
- Children: 1
- Parent: Thomas Nussey (Father)
- Education: Trinity Hall, Cambridge; Malvern College

Sir Thomas Willans Nussey, 1st Baronet DL JP (12 October 1868 – 12 October 1947) was an English barrister and Liberal Party politician. He was the Member of Parliament (MP) for Pontefract from 1893 to 1910.

== Family and education ==
Willans Nussey was the son of Thomas Nussey, a woollen manufacturer of Bramley Grange, Thorner near Leeds in the West Riding of Yorkshire. His sister Hilda (1875-1962) was a VAD nurse during the Great War at Gledhow Hall. Ellen Nussey (1817–1897), a lifelong friend of the writer Charlotte Brontë, was a cousin and was also related to Mrs Agnes Nussey of Potternewton Hall.

Nussey was educated at Malvern College until Christmas 1882, then at Leamington College for Boys and Trinity Hall, Cambridge.

== Career ==
Nussey went in for the law and in 1893 he was called to the bar at the Inner Temple. However he does not seem to have required an occupation to provide an income. He started to engage in political activity as soon as he came down from university and MPs did not receive salaries until 1911. In the 1830s, Nussey's father had started a woollen manufacturing business with his two brothers, Obadiah – Mayor of Leeds in 1864 – and Joseph, and this grew into a large and successful enterprise. It seems likely that Nussey had access to family money to allow him to seek a career in politics.

== Politics ==
Nussey held Liberal political views and was said to have remained faithful to the ideas and policies of William Ewart Gladstone all his life. He first stood for Parliament at the 1892 general election in the Maidstone division of Kent but in June 1893 there was a by-election in the Pontefract constituency in the West Riding of Yorkshire. The election of the sitting Liberal MP for Pontefract, Harold Reckitt at a by-election in February 1893, was declared void following an election petition and Nussey was selected to contest the seat. He won the by-election narrowly but held his seat until the December 1910 general election when he retired from the House of Commons.

== Honours and appointments ==
In 1909, Nussey was created a baronet in the Birthday Honours list. After stepping down from Parliament he in continued public life. He was a justice of the peace for the North Riding, chairman of the local bench, chairman of the North Yorkshire Quarter Sessions, chairman of the Appeals Committee and a deputy lieutenant of the North Riding.

== Private life ==
In 1897, Nussey married Edith Daniel, the daughter of a doctor of medicine from Fleetwood in Lancashire. At the time of the marriage, the Daniels were living in Scarborough and the wedding took place there. They had one son. Edith Nussey died in 1934 and in 1935 Nussey married secondly Edith Maud Cliff OBE from Leeds, who had been the Commandant of Gledhow Hall Military Hospital during the Great War. Nussey died at his home, Sutton Howgrave, Bedale in the North Riding of Yorkshire on 12 October 1947 aged exactly 79 years. Edith, Lady Nussey died in 1962. The heir to the Nussey baronetcy was his son from his first marriage, Thomas Moore Nussey (19 July 1898 – 25 October 1971).

== Papers ==
A collection of letters sent by Nussey's to the Liberal prime minister, Sir Henry Campbell-Bannerman, has been deposited in the British Library manuscript collection.

Parliament of the United Kingdom
Preceded by Harold Reckitt	Member of Parliament for Pontefract; 1893 – December 1910	Succeeded by Handel Booth
Baronetage of the United Kingdom
New creation	Baronet (of Rushwood Hall); 1909–1947	Succeeded by Thomas Nussey
