= Umbilical region =

Region of the abdomen

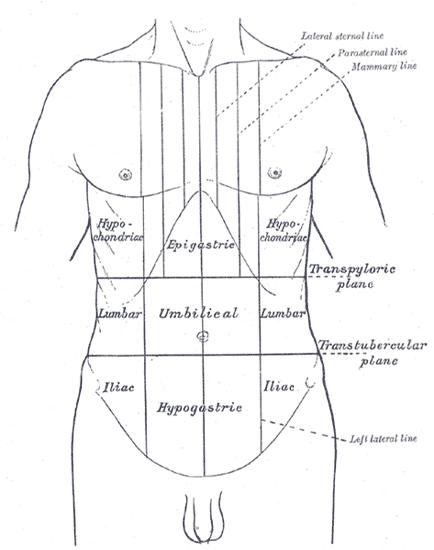
- Surface lines of the front of the thorax and abdomen.

Details

Identifiers
- Latin: regio umbilicalis
- TA98: A01.2.04.005
- TA2: 260
- FMA: 61584

The umbilical region is one of the nine regions of the abdomen. It is the region that surrounds the area around the umbilicus and is placed approximately halfway between the xiphoid process and the pubic symphysis. This region of the abdomen contains part of the stomach, the head of the pancreas, the duodenum, a section of the transverse colon and the lower aspects of the left and right kidney. The upper three regions, from left to right, are the left hypochondriac, epigastric, and right hypochondriac regions. The middle three regions, from left to right, are the left lumbar, umbilical, and right lumbar regions. The bottom three regions, from left to right, are the left inguinal, hypogastric, and right inguinal regions.
