= Muscle coactivation =

Contraction to provide joint stability

Muscle coactivation occurs when agonist and antagonist muscles (or synergist muscles) surrounding a joint contract simultaneously to provide joint stability, and is suggested to depend crucially on supraspinal processes involved in the control of movement. It is also known as muscle cocontraction, since two muscle groups are contracting at the same time. It is able to be measured using electromyography (EMG) from the contractions that occur. The general mechanism of it is still widely unknown. It is believed to be important in joint stabilization, as well as general motor control.

Coactivation of biceps and triceps. The biceps’ EMG is on top, while the triceps’ EMG is on the bottom.

== Function ==
Muscle coactivation allows muscle groups surrounding a joint to become more stable. This is due to both muscles (or sets of muscles) contracting at the same time, which produces compression on the joint. The joint is able to become stiffer and more stable due to this action. For example, when the biceps and the triceps coactivate, the elbow becomes more stable. This stabilization mechanism is also important for unexpected loads impeded on the joint, allowing the muscles to quickly coactivate and provide stability to the joint. This mechanism is controlled neuromuscularly, which allows the muscle(s) to contract. This occurs through a motor neuron sending a signal (through creating action potentials) to the muscle fiber to contract by releasing acetylcholine. When signals are sent to all muscle fibers in a muscle group, the muscle group will contract as a whole.

In the upper limbs, the stability of muscle coactivation allows for precise low-level physical tasks. An example of this would be picking up a small object. By protecting the muscles at the end of their range of motion, the direction of the fine movements is able to be changed. In the lower limbs, stability is important in upright standing balance. The coactivation of different muscle groups allows for proper balance and the ability to adjust weight and to stay upright on uneven ground. It is also believed to be important for postural control by stabilizing the spine. Muscle coactivation is absolutely necessary for learning a fine motor skill or for any activity involving stability. In order for muscle coactivation to occur, it must inhibit reciprocal innervation, which occurs when a muscle contracts and the synergist muscle relaxes. For muscle coactivation to occur, both the muscle and synergist muscle need to contract.

== Testing ==
Muscle coactivation is measured using a technique called electromyography(EMG). This is performed by using surface EMG that responds to electrical activity of the muscle through the skin. Electrical activity is only present in the muscle when the muscle voluntarily contracts. When the muscle is contracted, the EMG is able to display the force of the contraction or how the nerves can respond to stimulation. An EMG of coactivation would display the agonist and antagonist muscle contracting simultaneously. Although it is believed many muscles are involved in the mechanism of coactivation, methods to measure coactivation are finite to specific instances or two muscle systems. Because of this, little is understood about the role of coactivation in a multiple muscle system.
