= Sir Henry Morris, 1st Baronet =

British medical doctor, surgeon, author and editor

Sir Henry Morris FRCS
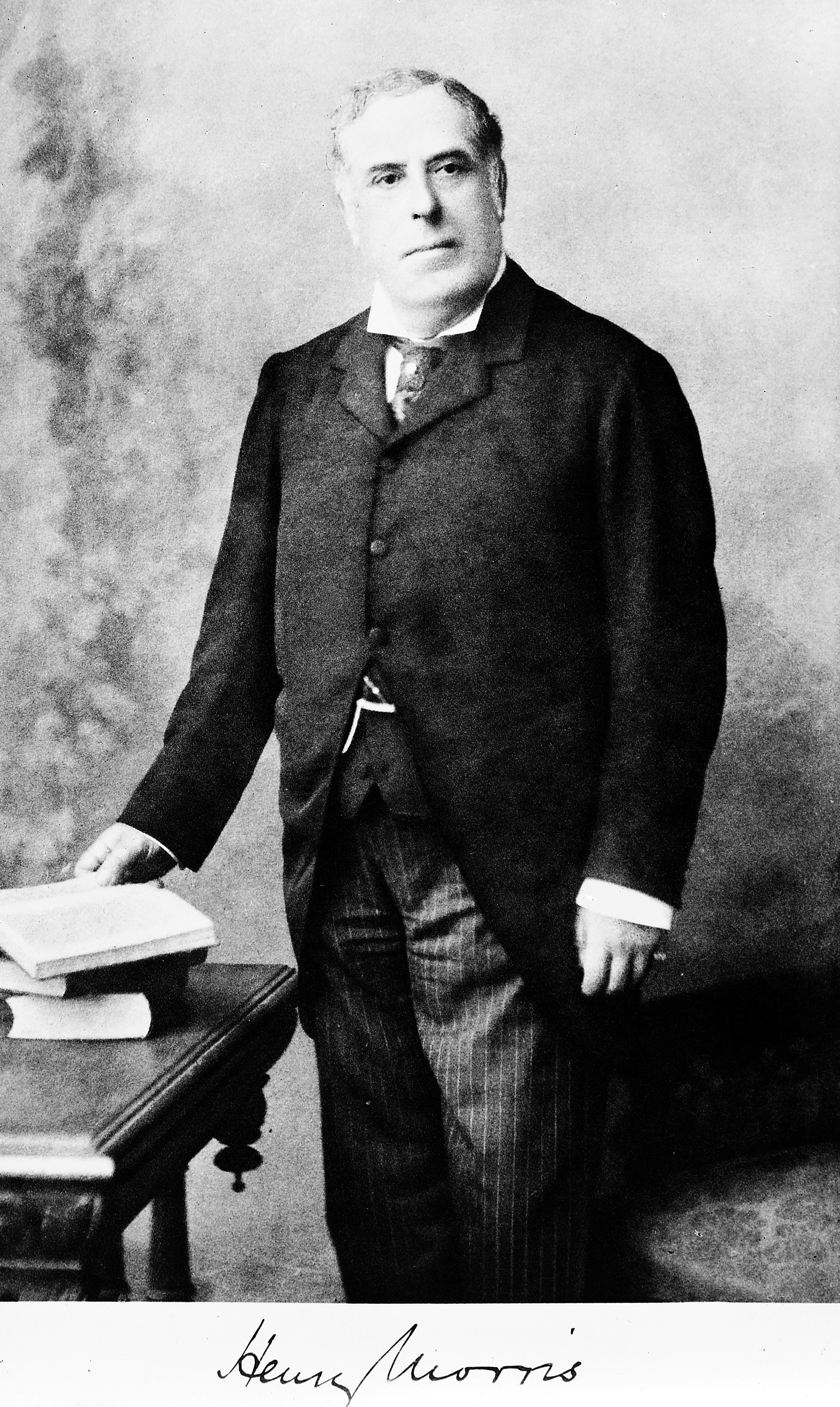
- Born: 7 January 1844
- Died: 14 June 1926 (aged 82)
- Education: Epsom College University College, London
- Occupation: Surgeon

Sir Henry Morris, 1st Baronet FRCS (7 January 1844 – 14 June 1926) was a British medical doctor and surgeon, president of the Royal Society of Medicine and the author and editor of significant works on anatomy. He was also known for his work in the field of cancer.

== Early career ==
Morris was the son of William Morris, surgeon from Petworth, Sussex. After his education at Epsom College and University College, London (BA 1863, MA 1870), he entered Guy's Hospital where, after graduating M.B., he became first a house surgeon and then the Resident Medical Officer. In 1870 he was appointed Surgical Registrar at the Middlesex Hospital, in 1871 Assistant Surgeon and Surgeon to the Out-Patient Department and from 1872 to 1881 Lecturer in Anatomy. From 1879 to 1889 he was Consulting Surgeon to the hospital.

== Publications in anatomy ==
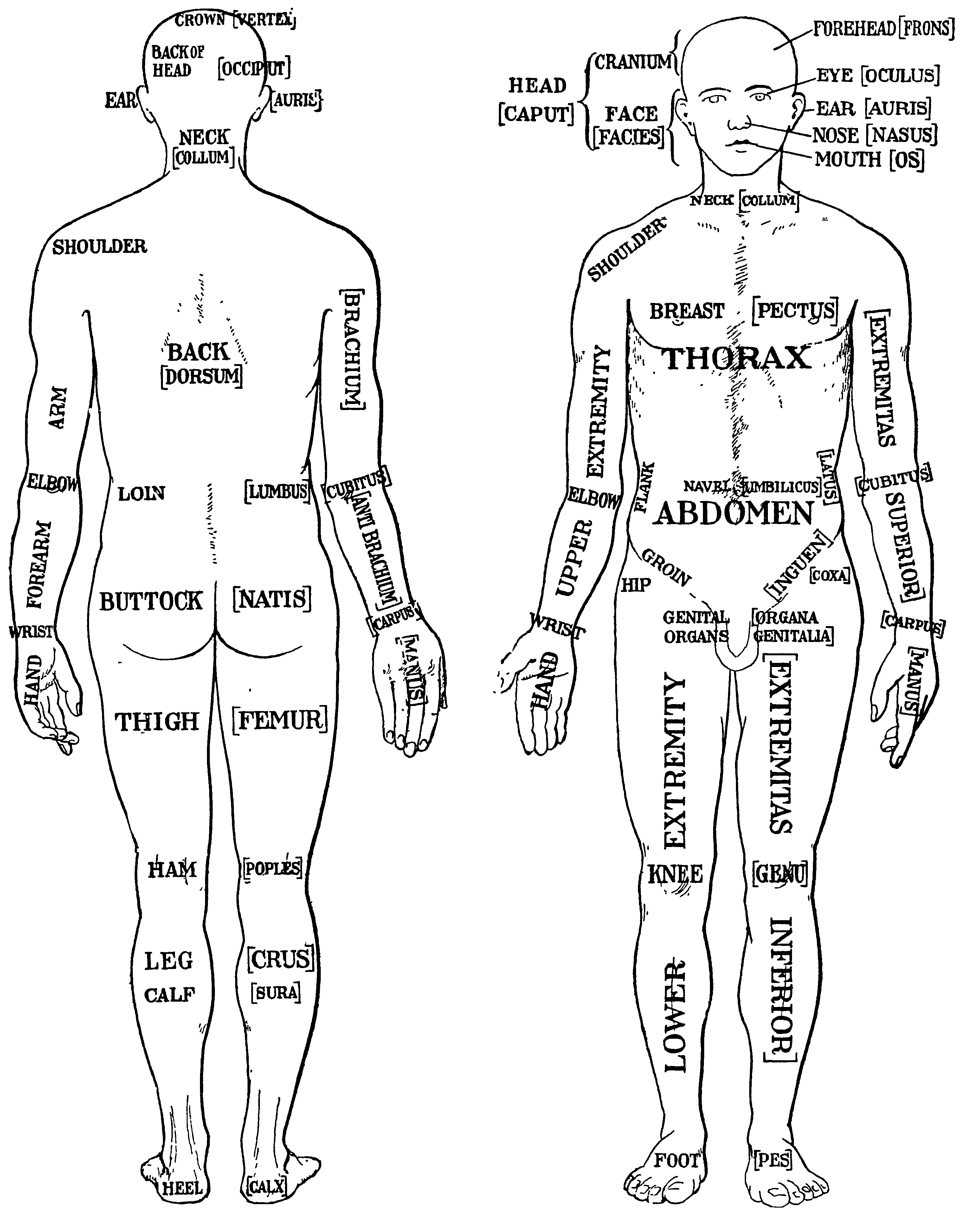
Parts of the Human Body: Posterior and Anterior View from the 1933 edition of Morris' A Treatise on Human Anatomy, the original 1893 edition of which he contributed to and edited.

Morris's time as lecturer in Anatomy led to some of his most distinguished publications, the first of which was The Anatomy of the Joints of Man (8 volumes, 43 plates, 1879; 8th American edition, Philadelphia, 1925). He later became the editor of the 1893 work, A Treatise on Human Anatomy. Morris himself was the author of "The Articulations" section, with other contemporaries contributing the rest. Even after his death, the work was published for quite some time.

== Work in cancer ==
He specialized in cancer surgery and the Imperial Cancer Research Fund, now Cancer Research UK, was established at a meeting in his house, with Morris appointed Treasurer and Vice-President. He pioneered a number of procedures, being the first surgeon at the Middlesex Hospital to perform a total colectomy (1877), pylorectomy (1885) and total excision of the larynx (1885). In 1880, he successfully removed a large calculus from an undilated kidney, the first operation of its kind in the UK and in 1889 successfully removed a large part of a malignant urinary bladder. He delivered the Bradshaw Lecture at the Royal College of Surgeons in 1903 on the subject of cancer.

== Later life and honors ==
He was elected President of the Royal College of Surgeons, 1906–09 and President of the Royal Society of Medicine, 1910–12. He was created a baronet on 24 July 1909. Morris supported Sir William Osler in the founding of The History of Medicine Society at The Royal Society of Medicine, London in 1912.

Morris married a Russian dancer but, as she predeceased him having no children, the baronetcy became extinct upon his death in 1926.

Baronetage of the United Kingdom
| New creation | Baronet (of Cavendish Square); 1909–1926 | Extinct |
| Preceded by Longman baronets | Morris baronets of Cavendish Square; 24 July 1909 | Succeeded by Nussey baronets |
