= Hypochondrium =

Upper left and right sections of the abdomen

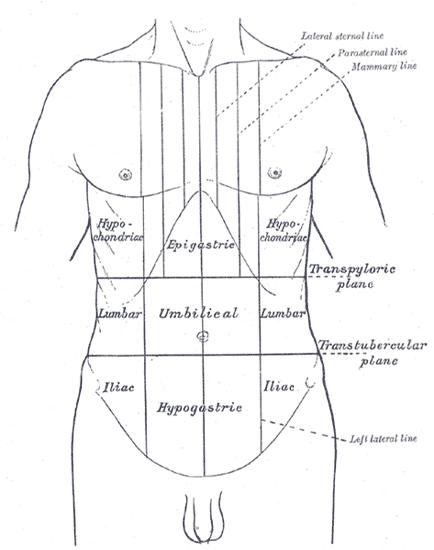
- Thorax and abdomen.

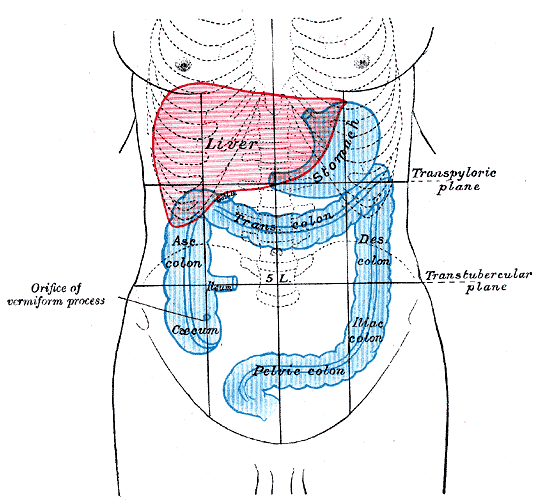
- Front of abdomen, showing surface markings for liver, stomach, and great intestine.

Details

Identifiers
- Latin: regio hypochondriaca
- TA98: A01.2.04.002
- TA2: 256
- FMA: 20390

In anatomy, the division of the abdomen into regions can employ a nine-region scheme. The hypochondrium refers to the two hypochondriac regions in the upper third of the abdomen; the left hypochondrium and right hypochondrium. They are located on the lateral sides of the abdominal wall respectively, inferior to (below) the thoracic cage, being separated by the epigastrium.

The liver is in the right hypochondrium, extending through the epigastrium and reaching the left hypochondrium. The spleen and some of the stomach are in the left hypochondrium.

== Definitions, etymology, and modern controversies ==
The word derives from the Greek word υποχόνδριο ("hypochondrio"). This Greek word means literally "below the cartilage" which refers to the costal cartilages. In other words, the word refers to the area of the ventral trunk that is located below the costal cartilages. The word once referred only to the soft portion of the abdomen between the rib cage and the navel (the region once believed to be the seat of hypochondriasis), but it is not used that way in modern anatomy's schemes for the regions of the abdomen.

Some sources have disputed usage of the term for the parts of the anterior abdominal wall below the costal margins. The region named the right hypochondrium exists anatomically, but is almost totally under the chest wall. In clinical situations, the parts of the abdominal wall just below the right and left costal margins are referred to as the right and left hypochondriac regions respectively.

== Significance of region ==
Clinically speaking, symptoms and signs arising from this region are of great importance and have a specific list of diseases in their differential diagnoses.

== Additional images ==
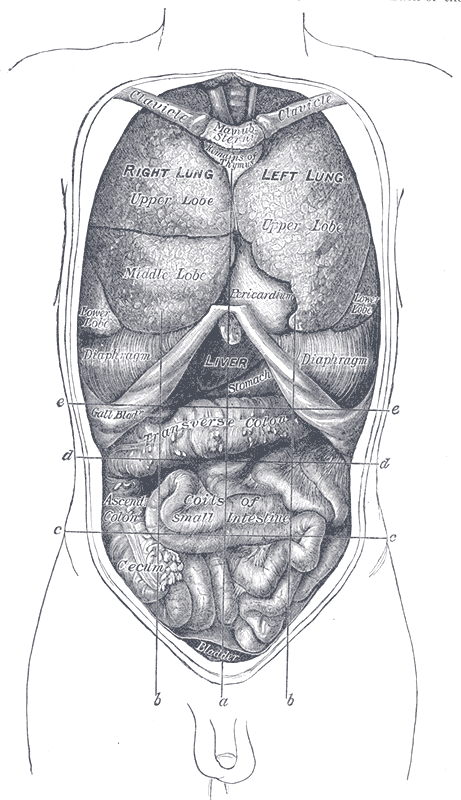
Front view of the thoracic and abdominal viscera

== See also ==
- Transpyloric plane
- Midclavicular line
- Hypochondriasis § Etymology
