= Median arcuate ligament syndrome =

- Other names: Celiac artery compression syndrome Celiac axis syndrome Celiac trunk compression syndrome Dunbar syndrome
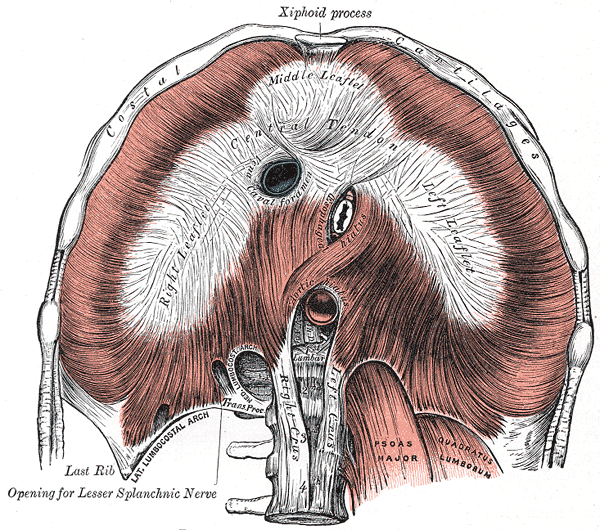
- Median arcuate ligament syndrome results from compression of the celiac artery by the median arcuate ligament. The median arcuate ligament is a fibrous arch formed by the left and right diaphragmatic crura, visible here on the underside of the diaphragm.
- Specialty: Gastroenterology, Vascular Surgery
- Symptoms: Epigastric pain, anorexia, Weight loss
- Complications: Gastroparesis; Aneurysm of the superior and inferior pancreaticoduodenal arteries
- Usual onset: 20 to 40 years of age
- Causes: Compression of the celiac artery from the median arcuate ligament
- Risk factors: Female sex
- Treatment: Surgery

In medicine, the median arcuate ligament syndrome (MALS, also known as celiac artery compression syndrome, celiac axis syndrome, celiac trunk compression syndrome or Dunbar syndrome) is a rare condition characterized by abdominal pain attributed to compression of the celiac artery and the celiac ganglia by the median arcuate ligament. The abdominal pain may be related to meals, may be accompanied by weight loss, and may be associated with an abdominal bruit heard by a clinician.

The diagnosis of MALS is one of exclusion, as many healthy patients demonstrate some degree of celiac artery compression in the absence of symptoms. Consequently, a diagnosis of MALS is typically only entertained after more common conditions have been ruled out. Once suspected, screening for MALS can be done with ultrasonography and confirmed with computed tomography (CT) or magnetic resonance (MR) angiography.

Treatment is generally surgical, the mainstay being open or laparoscopic division, or separation, of the median arcuate ligament combined with removal of the celiac ganglia. The majority of patients benefit from surgical intervention. Poorer responses to treatment tend to occur in patients of older age, those with a psychiatric condition or who use alcohol, have abdominal pain unrelated to meals, or who have not experienced weight loss.

== Signs and symptoms ==
Patients with MALS reportedly experience abdominal pain, particularly in the epigastrium, which may be associated with eating and which may result in anorexia and weight loss. The pain can be located on either the left or right side, but is typically felt where the ribs meet. Other signs are persistent nausea, lassitude (especially after a heavy meal), and exercise intolerance. Diarrhea is a common symptom; some experience constipation. While some experience vomiting, not everyone does. Exercise or certain postures can aggravate the symptoms. Occasionally, physical examination reveals an abdominal bruit in the mid-epigastrium.

Complications of MALS result from chronic compression of the celiac artery. They include gastroparesis and aneurysm of the superior and inferior pancreaticoduodenal arteries.

== Anatomy ==
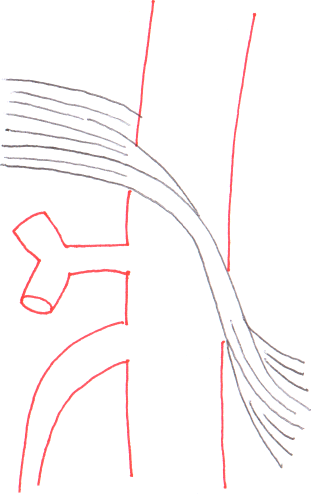
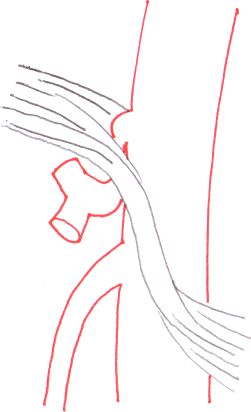
Side views (sagittal plane) of the descending aorta and two of its branches, the celiac trunk and superior mesenteric artery, demonstrate normal and MALS anatomy. Left The median arcuate ligament is normally several millimeters to centimeters superior to the origin of the celiac artery. Right In MALS, the ligament is anterior, rather than superior, to the celiac artery, resulting in compression of the vessel and a characteristic hook-shaped contour.

The median arcuate ligament is a ligament formed at the base of the diaphragm where the left and right diaphragmatic crura join near the 12th thoracic vertebra. This fibrous arch forms the anterior aspect of the aortic hiatus, through which the aorta, thoracic duct, and azygos vein pass. The median arcuate ligament usually comes into contact with the aorta above the branch point of the celiac artery. However, in up to one quarter of normal individuals, the median arcuate ligament passes in front of the celiac artery, compressing the celiac artery and nearby structures such as the celiac ganglia. In some of these individuals, this compression is pathologic. It leads to the median arcuate ligament syndrome.

== Mechanism ==
Several theories attempt to explain the origin of pain caused by compression of the celiac artery. One proposes that compression of the celiac artery causes ischemia, or decreased blood flow, to abdominal organs, leading to pain. Another hypothesis is that there is compression not only of the celiac artery but also of the celiac ganglia, and that pain results from compression of the latter.

== Diagnosis ==
Median arcuate ligament syndrome is a diagnosis of exclusion. That is, the diagnosis of MALS is generally considered only after patients have undergone an extensive evaluation of their gastrointestinal tract including upper endoscopy, colonoscopy, and evaluation for gallbladder disease and gastroesophageal reflux disease (GERD).

The diagnosis of MALS relies on a combination of clinical features and findings on medical imaging. Clinical features include those signs and symptoms mentioned above; classically, MALS involves a triad of abdominal pain after eating, weight loss, and an abdominal bruit, although the classic triad is found in only a minority of individuals that carry a MALS diagnosis.

Diagnostic imaging for MALS is divided into screening and confirmatory tests. A reasonable screening test for patients with suspected MALS is duplex ultrasonography to measure blood flow through the celiac artery. Peak systolic velocities greater than 200 cm/s are suggestive of celiac artery stenosis associated with MALS.

CT angiographic findings in MALS
1. Focal narrowing of proximal celiac artery with poststenotic dilatation
2. Indentation on the superior aspect of the celiac artery
3. Hook-shaped contour of the celiac artery

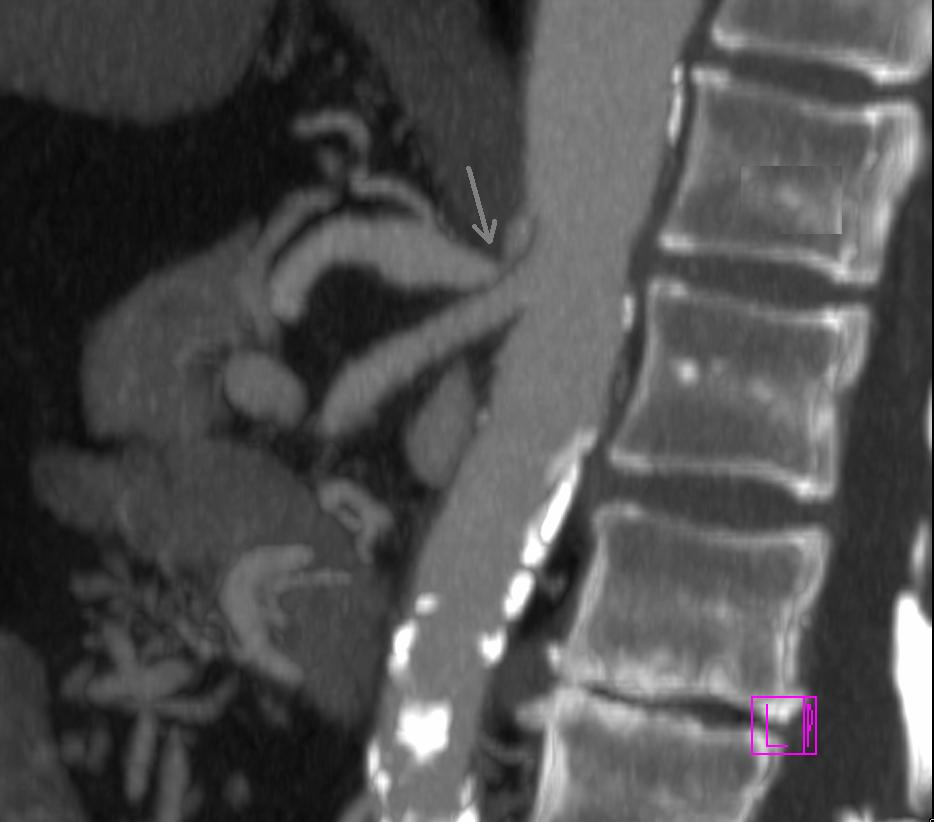

Further evaluation and confirmation can be obtained via angiography to investigate the anatomy of the celiac artery. Historically, conventional angiography was used, although this has been largely replaced by less invasive techniques such as computed tomography (CT) and magnetic resonance (MR) angiography. Because it provides better visualization of intra-abdominal structures, CT angiography is preferred to MR angiography in this setting. The findings of focal narrowing of the proximal celiac artery with poststenotic dilatation, indentation on the superior aspect of the celiac artery, and a hook-shaped contour of the celiac artery support a diagnosis of MALS. These imaging features are exaggerated on expiration, even in normal asymptomatic individuals without the syndrome.

Proximal celiac artery stenosis with poststenotic dilatation can be seen in other conditions affecting the celiac artery. The hook-shaped contour of the celiac artery is characteristic of the anatomy in MALS and helps distinguish it from other causes of celiac artery stenosis such as atherosclerosis. This hooked contour is not entirely specific for MALS however, given that 10–24% of normal asymptomatic individuals have this anatomy.

== Treatment ==
Decompression of the celiac artery is the general approach to the treatment of MALS. The mainstay of treatment involves open or laparoscopic surgery approaches to divide, or separate, the median arcuate ligament to relieve the compression of the celiac artery. This is combined with the removal of the celiac ganglia and evaluation of blood flow through the celiac artery, for example, by intraoperative duplex ultrasound. If blood flow is poor, celiac artery revascularization is usually attempted; methods of revascularization include aortoceliac bypass, patch angioplasty, and others.

In recent years, a laparoscopic approach has been used to achieve celiac artery decompression; however, should the celiac artery require revascularization, the procedure would require conversion to an open approach.

Endovascular methods such as percutaneous transluminal angioplasty (PTA) have been used in patients who have failed open and/or laparoscopic intervention. PTA alone, without decompression of the celiac artery, may not be of benefit.

== Prognosis ==
There are few studies of the long-term outcomes of patients treated for MALS. According to Duncan, the largest and more relevant late outcomes data come from a study of 51 patients who underwent open surgical treatment for MALS, 44 of whom were available for long-term follow-up at an average of nine years following therapy. The investigators reported that among patients who underwent celiac artery decompression and revascularization, 75% remained asymptomatic at follow-up. In this study, predictors of favorable outcome included:

- Age from 40 to 60 years
- Lack of psychiatric condition or alcohol use
- Abdominal pain that was worse after meals
- Weight loss greater than 20 lb (9.1 kg)

== Epidemiology ==
It is estimated that in 10–24% of normal, asymptomatic individuals, the median arcuate ligament crosses in front of (anterior to) the celiac artery, causing some degree of compression. Approximately 1% of these individuals exhibit severe compression associated with symptoms of MALS. The syndrome most commonly affects individuals between 20 and 40 years old, and is more common in women, particularly thin women. It is also commonly associated with Ehlers–Danlos syndrome.

== History ==
Celiac artery compression was first observed by Benjamin Lipshutz in 1917. MALS was first described by Pekka-Tapani Harjola in 1963 and subsequently by J. David Dunbar and Samuel Marable in 1965. It has also been called Harjola-Marable syndrome and Marable syndrome.

== See also ==
- Nutcracker syndrome
- Superior mesenteric artery syndrome
