= Lumbocostal arch =

Lumbocostal arch can refer to:

- Medial lumbocostal arch
- Lateral lumbocostal arch
