= Arcus =

Arcus may refer to:

== Businesses and organizations ==
- ARCUS, the Arctic Research Consortium of the United States, formerly supporting Arctic policy in the U.S.
- Arcus AS, a Norwegian producer of liquor
- Arcus Co., a Bulgarian firearm manufacturer
- Arcus Foundation, supporting great apes and LGBT rights
- Arcus-Air, a German airline

== Gliders ==
- Schempp-Hirth Arcus a two-seat glider
- Pegas Arcus, a Czech paraglider design
- Swing Arcus, German paraglider design

== Human anatomy ==
- Arcus anterior atlantis
- Arcus aortae
- Arcus corneae
- Arcus costalis
- Arcus dentalis
- Arcus dentalis mandibularis
- Arcus dentalis maxillaris
- Arcus ductus thoracici
- Arcus iliopectineus
- Arcus inguinalis
- Arcus lumbocostalis lateralis
- Arcus lumbocostalis medialis
- Arcus palatini
- Arcus palatoglossus
- Arcus palatopharyngeus
- Arcus palmaris profundus
- Arcus palmaris superficialis
- Arcus pedis longitudinalis pars lateralis
- Arcus pedis longitudinalis pars medialis
- Arcus pedis transversalis
- Arcus plantaris
- Arcus plantaris profundus
- Arcus posterior atlantis
- Arcus pubis
- Arcus tendineus fasciae pelvis
- Arcus unguium
- Arcus venosus dorsalis pedis
- Arcus venosus jugularis
- Arcus venosus palmaris profundus
- Arcus venosus palmaris superficialis
- Arcus venosus plantaris
- Arcus volaris profundus
- Arcus volaris superficialis

== Video games ==
- Arcus II: Silent Symphony
- Arcus Odyssey
- Arcus (video game), see List of X68000 games

== Other uses ==
- Arcus cloud formation
- Agfa Arcus scanners
- Arcus (planetary geology) (pl. arcūs), an arc-shaped feature
- Arcus senilis, age-related change in the iris
- Arcus (satellite), a proposed X-ray space telescope
- Inverse trigonometric functions, also called arcus or arc functions
- Arcus Argentariorum, an arch of San Giorgio al Velabro Church, Rome, Italy
- Arcus, the main protagonist of the webcomic Acception
