= Thoracic aorta =

Part of the aorta located in the thorax

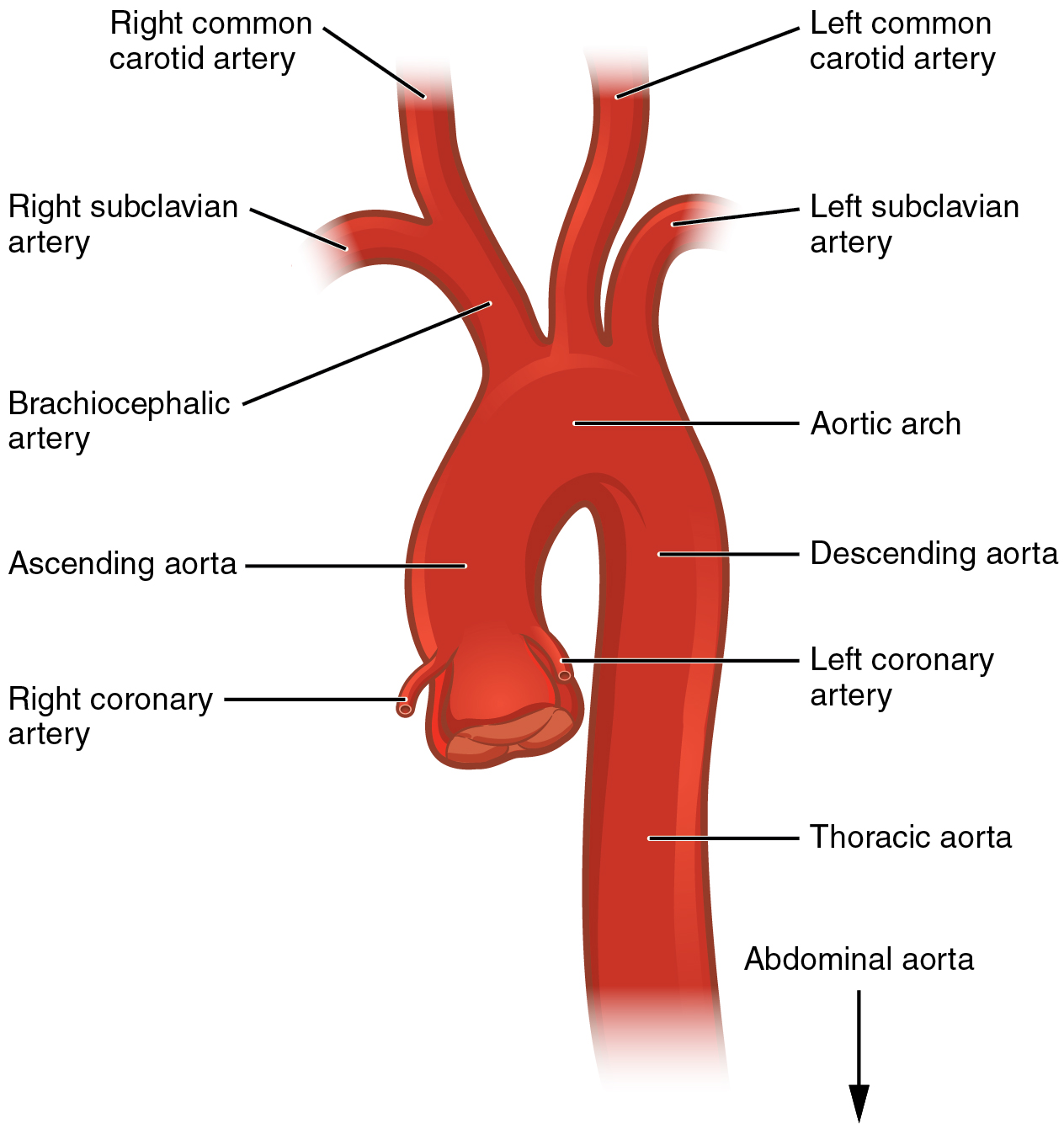
- Schematic view of the aorta, showing major branches and segments with thoracic aorta shown as continuation of descending aorta

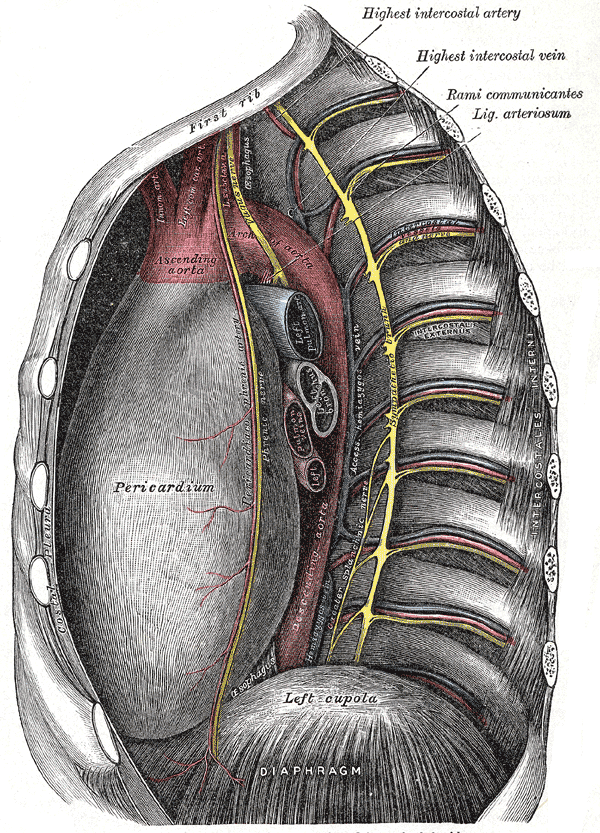
- The thoracic aorta, viewed from the left side.

Details
- Source: Descending aorta
- Branches: Bronchial arteries, esophageal arteries, posterior intercostal arteries, abdominal aorta, superior phrenic artery, pericardial arteries

Identifiers
- Latin: aorta thoracica, pars thoracica aortae
- MeSH: D001013
- TA98: A12.2.11.001
- TA2: 4186
- FMA: 3786

The thoracic aorta is a part of the aorta located in the thorax. It is a continuation of the aortic arch. It is located within the posterior mediastinal cavity, but frequently bulges into the left pleural cavity. The descending thoracic aorta begins at the lower border of the fourth thoracic vertebra and ends in front of the lower border of the twelfth thoracic vertebra, at the aortic hiatus in the diaphragm where it becomes the abdominal aorta.

At its commencement, it is situated on the left of the vertebral column; it approaches the median line as it descends; and, at its termination, lies directly in front of the column.

The thoracic aorta has a curved shape that faces forward, and has small branches. It has a radius of approximately 1.16 cm.

== Structure ==
The thoracic aorta is part of the descending aorta, which has different parts named according to their structure or location. The thoracic aorta is a continuation of the descending aorta and becomes the abdominal aorta when it passes through the diaphragm. The initial part of the aorta, the ascending aorta, rises out of the left ventricle, from which it is separated by the aortic valve. The two coronary arteries of the heart arise from the aortic root, just above the cusps of the aortic valve. The aorta then arches back over the right pulmonary artery. Three vessels come out of the aortic arch: the brachiocephalic artery, the left common carotid artery, and the left subclavian artery. These vessels supply blood to the head, neck, thorax and upper limbs.

Behind the descending thoracic aorta is the vertebral column and the hemiazygos vein. To the right is the azygos veins and thoracic duct, and to the left is the left pleura and lung. In front of the thoracic aorta lies the root of the left lung, the pericardium, the esophagus, and the diaphragm.

The esophagus, which is covered by a nerve plexus lies to the right of the descending thoracic aorta. Lower, the esophagus passes in front of the aorta, and ultimately is situated on the left.

== Function ==
The aorta is an artery that conveys oxygenated blood from the heart to other parts of the body. It is one of the largest arteries in the body. The aorta gives off several paired branches as it descends. In descending order, these include the

- Bronchial arteries
- Mediastinal arteries
- Esophageal arteries
- Pericardial arteries
- Superior phrenic arteries

Note: The posterior intercostal arteries are branches that originate throughout the length of the posterior aspect of the descending thoracic aorta.

== Clinical significance ==
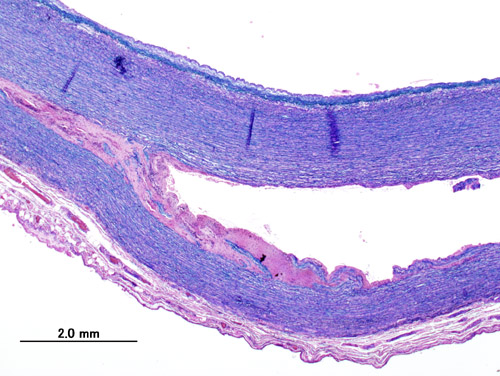
Histopathological image of dissecting aneurysm of descending thoracic aorta in a patient without evidence of Marfan's trait. The damaged aorta was surgically removed and replaced by artificial vessel. Victoria blue & HE stain.

- Aortic dissection
- Thoracic aortic aneurysm

== Additional images ==
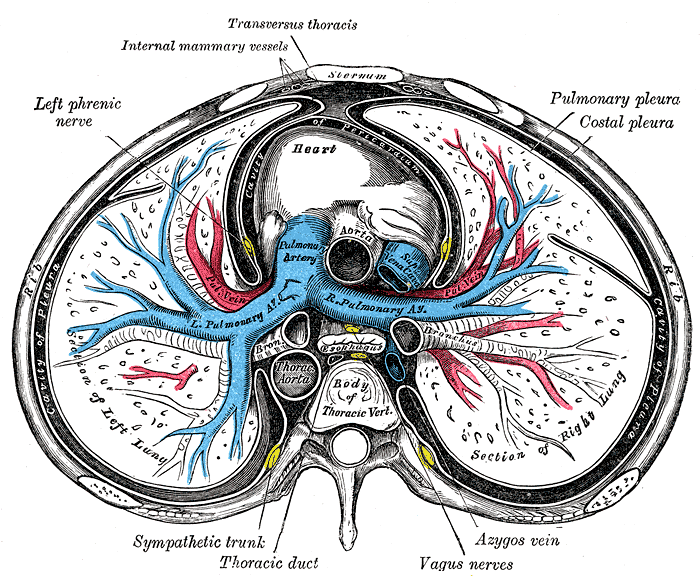
Transverse section of thorax, showing relations of pulmonary artery.

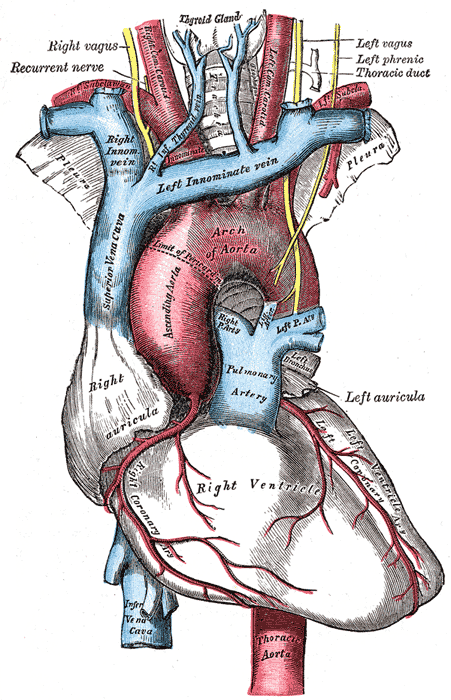
The arch of the aorta, and its branches.
