= Morgagni =

Morgagni can refer to:

- Giovanni Battista Morgagni, an Italian anatomist
  - Structures and conditions named after this person:
  - Morgagni's hernia
  - Foramina of Morgagni (sternocostal triangle)
  - Hydatid of Morgagni
  - Sinus of Morgagni (aorta)
  - Sinus of Morgagni (pharynx)
  - Pillars (or Columns) of Morgagni
- Manlio Morgagni, Italian Fascist
- Tullo Morgagni, Italian journalist and sports race director
