= Abbott's artery =

Anatomical variation

Abbott's artery describes an anomalous artery that arises from the posteromedial aspect of the proximal part of the descending aorta. Normally a minor congenital abnormality, its presence is important during surgical repair of coarctation of the aorta.
