= Phrenic vein =

Phrenic vein may refer to:

- Inferior phrenic vein
- Superior phrenic vein
