= Septum transversum =

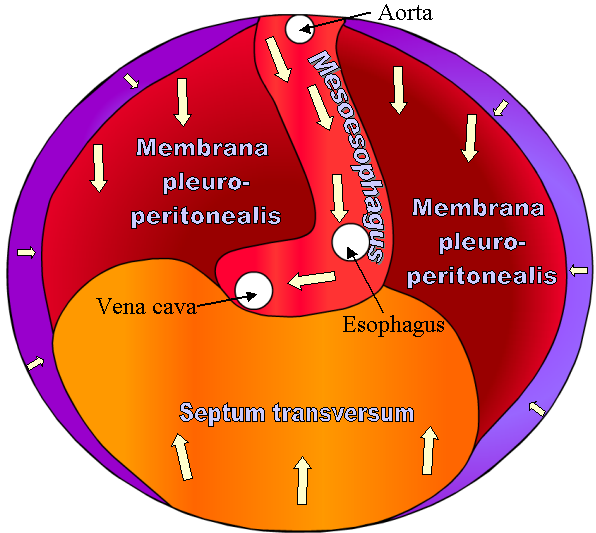
- Diaphragm of embryo.

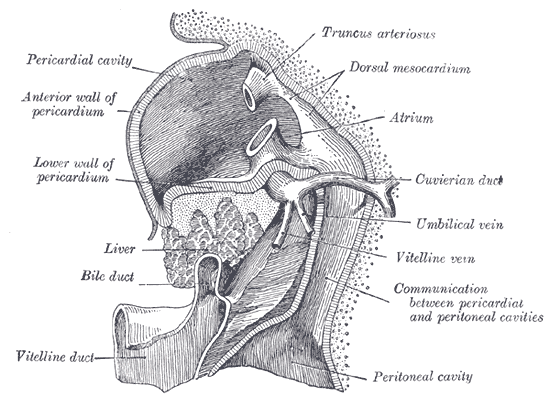
- Liver with the septum transversum. Human embryo 3 mm. long.

Details
- Carnegie stage: 10
- Precursor: mesenchyme
- Gives rise to: diaphragm / Ventral mesentery

Identifiers
- TE: transversum_by_E5.2.0.4.0.0.2 E5.2.0.4.0.0.2

The septum transversum is a thick mass of cranial mesenchyme, formed in the embryo, that gives rise to parts of the thoracic diaphragm and the ventral mesentery of the foregut in the developed human being and other mammals.

== Origins ==
The septum transversum originally arises as the most cranial part of the mesenchyme on day 22. During craniocaudal folding, it assumes a position cranial to the developing heart at the level of the cervical vertebrae. During subsequent weeks the dorsal end of the embryo grows much faster than its ventral counterpart resulting in an apparent descent of the ventrally located septum transversum. At week 8, it can be found at the level of the thoracic vertebrae.

== Nerve supply ==
After successful craniocaudal folding the septum transversum picks up innervation from the adjacent ventral rami of spinal nerves C3, C4 and C5, thus forming the precursor of the phrenic nerve. During the descent of the septum, the phrenic nerve is carried along and assumes its descending pathway.

During embryonic development of the thoracic diaphragm, myoblast cells from the septum invade the other components of the diaphragm. They thus give rise to the motor and sensory innervation of the muscular diaphragm by the phrenic nerve.

== Derivatives ==
The cranial part of the septum transversum gives rise to the central tendon of the diaphragm, and is the origin of the myoblasts that invade the pleuroperitoneal folds resulting in the formation of the muscular diaphragm.

The caudal part of the septum transversum is invaded by the hepatic diverticulum which divides within it to form the liver and thus gives rise to the ventral mesentery of the foregut, which in turn is the precursor of the lesser omentum, the visceral peritoneum of the liver and the falciform ligament.

Though not derived from the septum transversum, development of the liver is highly dependent upon signals originating here. Bone morphogenetic protein 2 (BMP-2), BMP-4 and BMP-7 produced from the septum transversum join fibroblast growth factor (FGF) signals from the cardiac mesoderm induce part of the foregut to differentiate towards a hepatic fate.

== Additional images ==
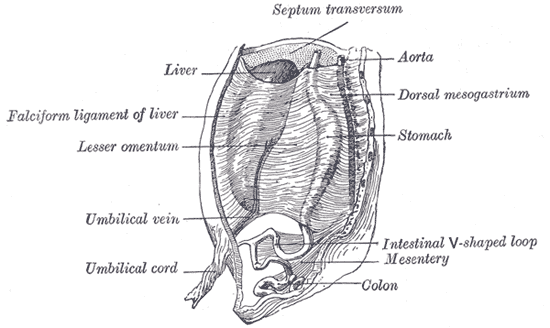
The primitive mesentery of a six weeks’ human embryo, half schematic.

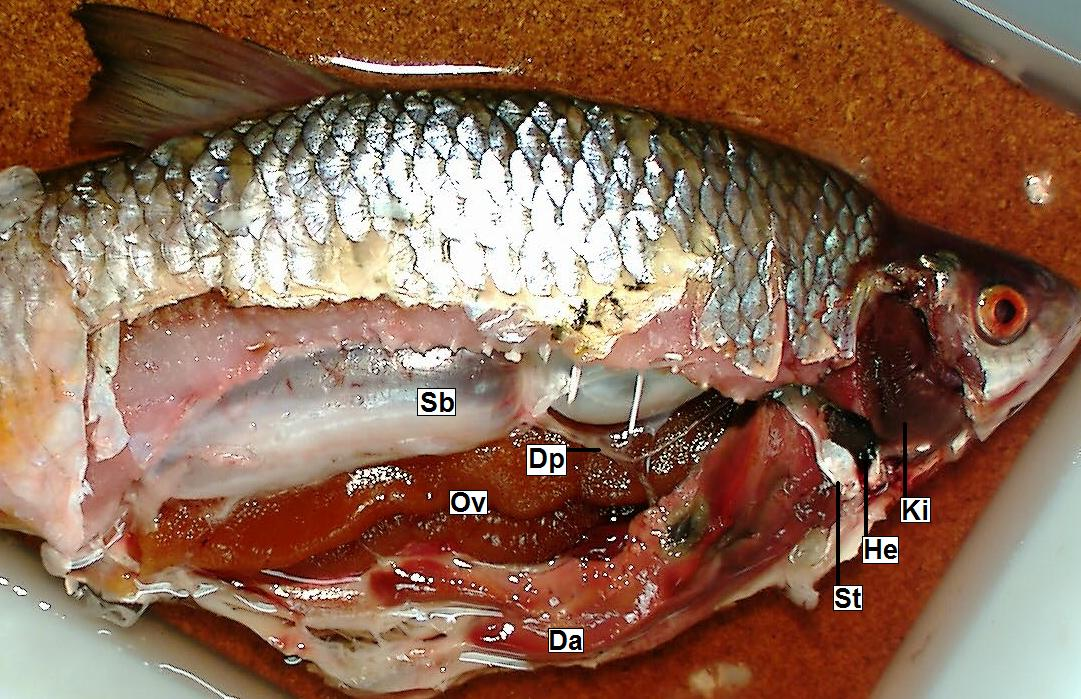
A dissected common rudd showing the septum transversum (marked as "St") behind the heart
