= Phrenic arteries =

Phrenic arteries may refer to

- Inferior phrenic arteries
- Superior phrenic arteries
