= Vena caval foramen =

Part of the diaphragm

Aortic hiatus
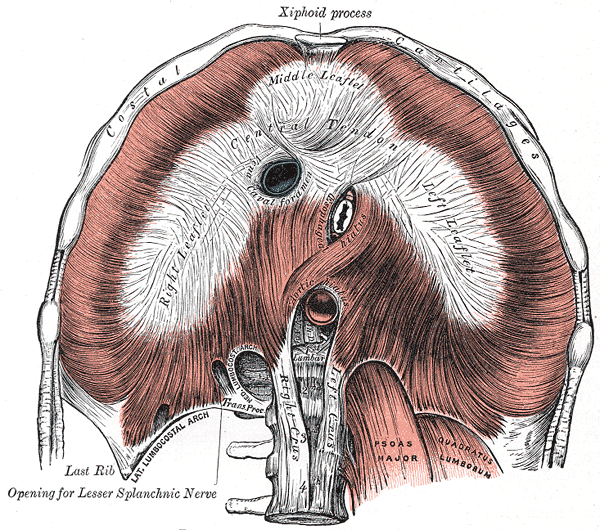
- The undersurface of the diaphragm with the vena caval opening labeled.

Details

Identifiers
- Latin: foramen venae cavae, foramen quadratus

The caval opening of diaphragm (also foramen of vena cava, vena caval foramen) is an opening in the central tendon of diaphragm giving passage to the inferior vena cava as well as to some terminal branches of the right phrenic nerve, and some lymphatic vessels en route to middle phrenic and mediastinal lymph nodes. The foramen occurs between the middle leaf and the right leaf of the central tendon of diaphragm, with the fibres of the central tendon uniting vigorously with the adventitia of the inferior vena cava (resulting in dilation of the IVC with contraction of the diaphragm during inspiration so as to facilitate venous return to the heart).

It is the superior-most of the three large diaphragmatic openings and is situated at the level of (sources differ) the 8th thoracic vertebra (T8)/the intervertebral disc between T8 and T9 vertebrae. It is situated slightly to the right of the midline.
