= Notching of the ribs =

Radiologic sign

Notching of the ribs (or rib notching) is a radiologic sign where the surface of the rib is deformed. It can be characterized as unilateral or bilateral, and should be differentiated between affecting the upper (superior) or lower (inferior) surface of the rib.

== Causes ==
Inferior rib notching can be associated with aortic coarctation (as a result of dilatation of intercostal arteries), superior vena caval obstruction, arteriovenous fistula, or following a Blalock Taussig shunt.

Causes of inferior rib notching by etiology:

Arterial: aortic coarctation, aortic thrombosis, pulmonary-oligemia/arteriovenous malformation, Blalock Taussig shunt, Tetralogy of fallot (TOF), absent pulmonary artery, and pulmonary stenosis.

Venous: arteriovenous malformations of the chest wall, superior vena cava, or other central venous obstruction.

Neurogenic: intercostal neuroma, Neurofibromatosis type 1, poliomyelitis.

Osseous: hyperparathyroidism, thalassemia, Melnick–Needles syndrome.

Other causes of superior rib notching include poliomyelitis, osteogenesis imperfecta, neurofibromatosis, Marfan's syndrome, collagen vascular disease, and hyperparathyroidism.
