= Pericardiacophrenic veins =

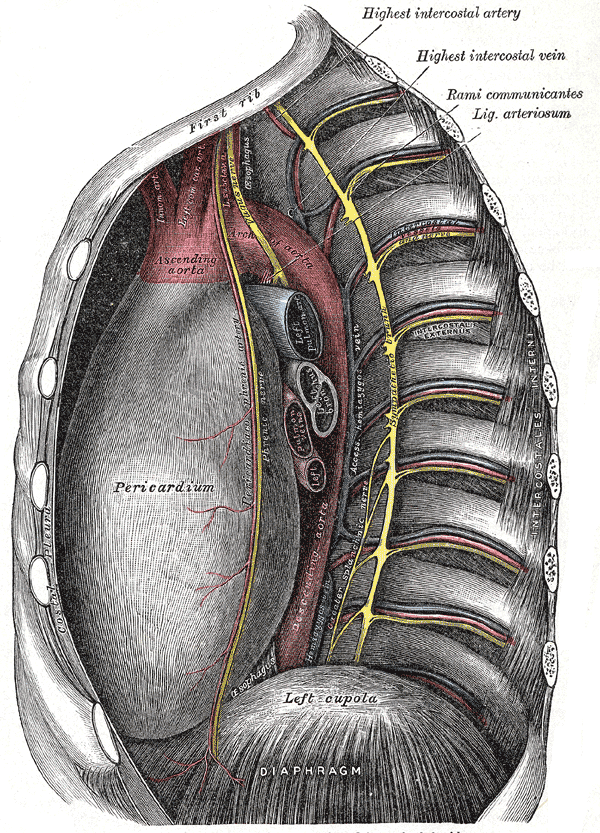
- The thoracic aorta, viewed from the left side. (Pericardiacophrenic veins not labeled, but pericardiacophrenic artery labeled at center left.)

Details
- Drains to: Brachiocephalic vein
- Artery: Pericardiacophrenic artery

Identifiers
- Latin: venae pericardiacophrenicae
- TA98: A12.3.04.007
- TA2: 4775
- FMA: 70830

Pericardiacophrenic veins are the venae comitantes of the pericardiacophrenic arteries. Pericardiacophrenic vessels accompany the phrenic nerve in the middle mediastinum of the thorax. The vein drains into the internal thoracic vein, or brachiocephalic vein.
