= Median arcuate ligament =

Ligament under the diaphragm

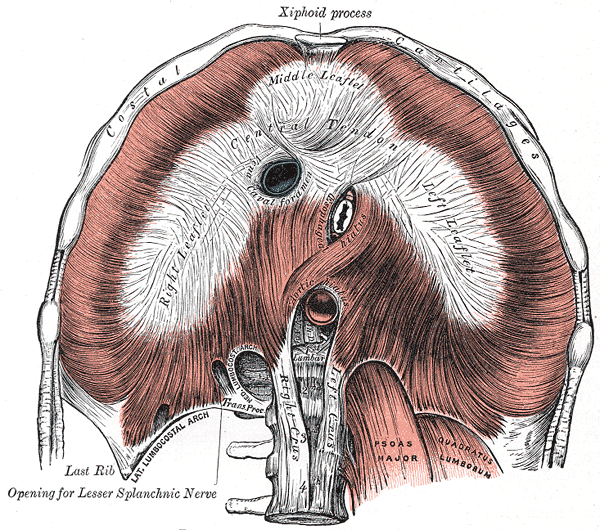
- The diaphragm. Under surface.

Details

Identifiers
- Latin: ligamentum arcuatum medianum
- TA98: A04.4.02.005
- TA2: 2343
- FMA: 58281

The median arcuate ligament is a ligament under the diaphragm that connects the right and left crura of diaphragm.

== Structure ==
The median arcuate ligament is formed by the right and left crura of the diaphragm. The crura connect to form an arch, behind which is the aortic hiatus, through which pass the aorta, the azygos vein, and the thoracic duct.

=== Variation ===
In between 10% and 24% of people, the median arcuate ligament occurs very low.

== Clinical significance ==
Compression of celiac artery and celiac ganglia by the median arcuate ligament being too low in some individuals; this can lead to the median arcuate ligament syndrome, which is characterized by abdominal pain, weight loss, and an epigastric bruit.

== See also ==
- Medial arcuate ligament
- Lateral arcuate ligament
