= Superior phrenic vein =

Details
- Drains from: Thoracic diaphragm
- Drains to: Azygos vein hemiazygos vein
- Artery: Superior phrenic artery

Identifiers
- Latin: vena phrenica superior
- TA98: A12.3.07.010
- TA2: 4755, 4769
- FMA: 70888

The superior phrenic vein, i.e., the vein accompanying the pericardiacophrenic artery, usually opens into the azygos vein.
