= Mediastinal branches of thoracic part of aorta =

Blood supply to lymph glands in the lower thorax

Details
- Source: thoracic aorta
- Supplies: posterior mediastinum

Identifiers
- Latin: rami mediastinales partis thoracicae aortae
- TA98: A12.2.11.005; A12.2.08.030
- TA2: 4190
- FMA: 71539

The mediastinal branches are numerous small vessels which supply the lymph glands and loose areolar tissue in the posterior mediastinum.
