= Thoracic aortic aneurysm =

- Other names: Aneurysm - thoracic aortic
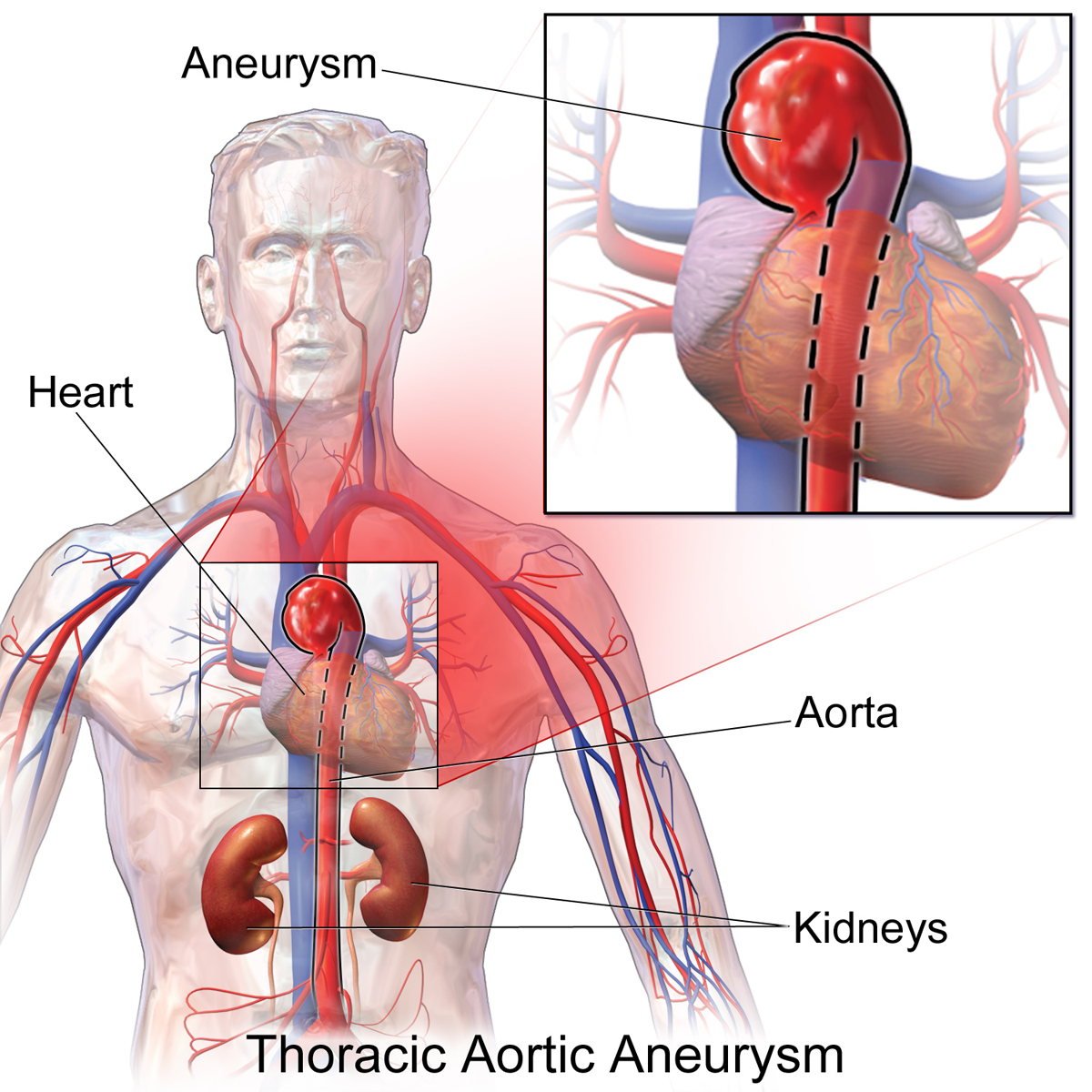
- Specialty: Cardiology

A thoracic aortic aneurysm is an aortic aneurysm that presents primarily in the thorax.

A thoracic aortic aneurysm is the "ballooning" of the upper aspect of the aorta, above the diaphragm. Untreated or unrecognized they can be fatal due to dissection or "popping" of the aneurysm leading to nearly instant death. Thoracic aneurysms are less common than an abdominal aortic aneurysm. However, a syphilitic aneurysm is more likely to be a thoracic aortic aneurysm than an abdominal aortic aneurysm. This condition is commonly treated via a specialized multidisciplinary approach with both vascular surgeons and cardiac surgeons.

== Presentation ==
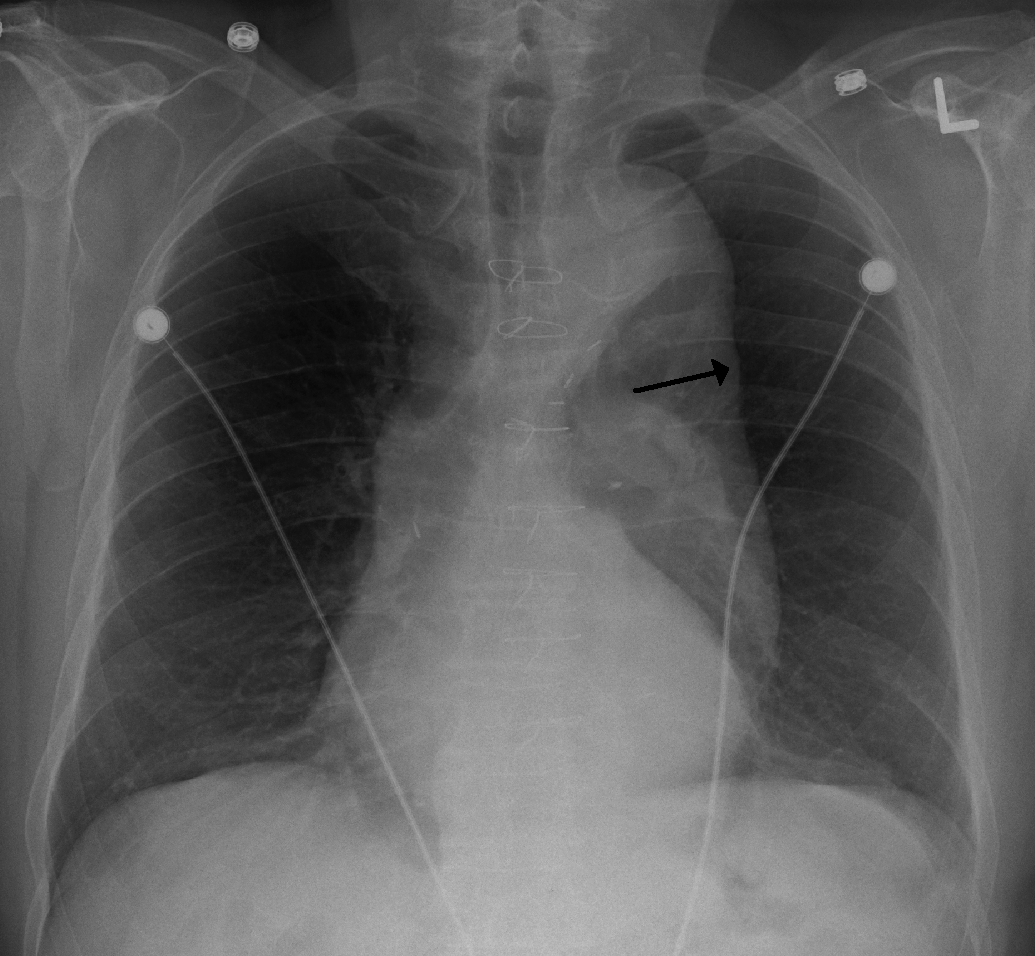
Thoracic aortic aneurysm with arrow marking the lateral border of the aorta

=== Complications ===
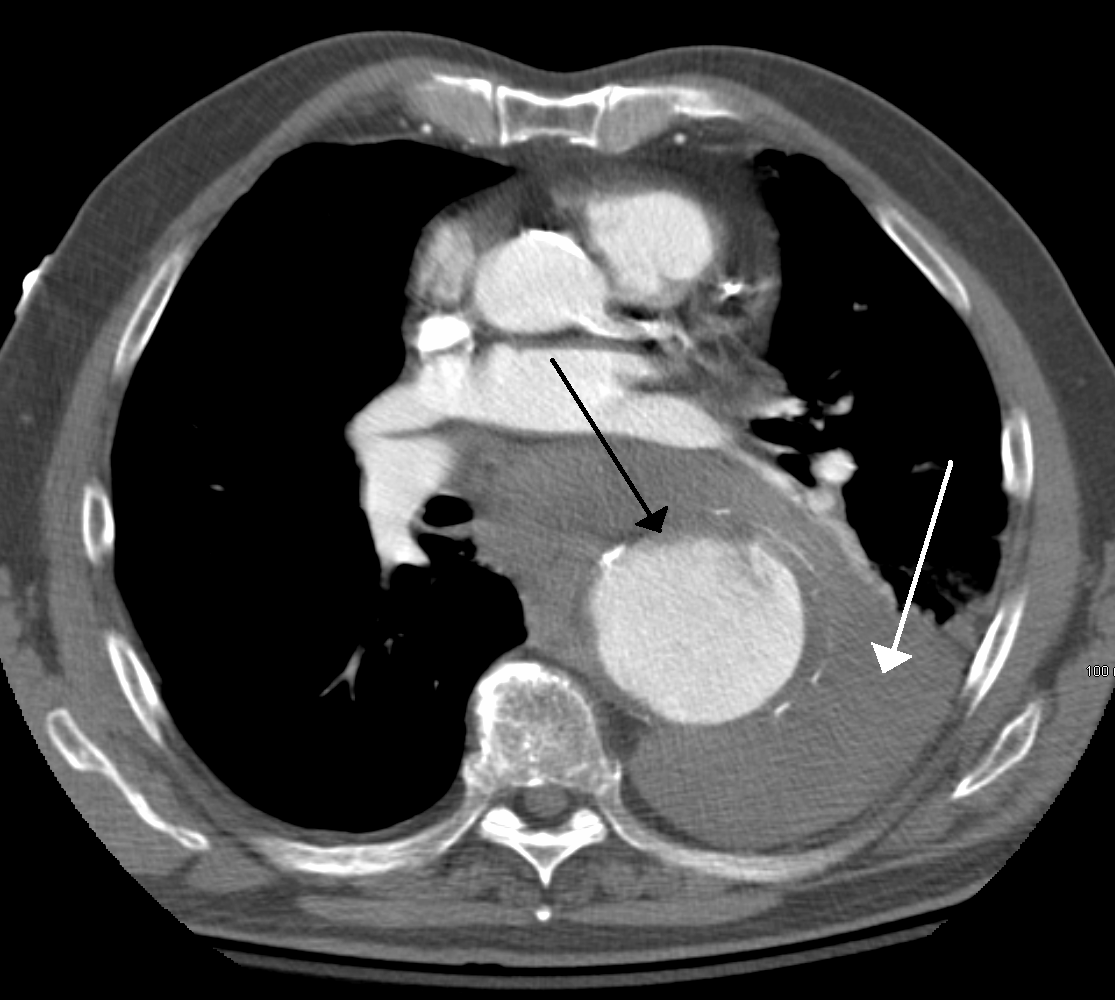
Contrast enhanced CT of a ruptured large (7 cm) thoracic aneurysm, with black arrow indicating the aorta, and white arrow blood in the thorax

The principal causes of death due to thoracic aneurysmal disease are dissection and rupture. Once rupture occurs, the mortality rate is 50–80%. Most deaths in patients with Marfan syndrome are the result of aortic disease.

== Causes ==
There are a number of causes, Aneurysms in patients younger than 40 usually involve the ascending aorta due to a weakening of the aortic wall associated with connective tissue disorders like the Marfan and Ehlers-Danlos syndromes or congenital bicuspid aortic valve. Younger patients may develop aortic aneurysms of the thoracoabdominal aorta after an aortic dissection. It can also be caused by blunt injury. Atherosclerosis is the principal cause of descending aortic aneurysms, while aneurysms of the aortic arch may be due to dissection, atherosclerosis, or inflammation.

=== Age ===
The diagnosis of thoracic aortic aneurysm usually involves patients in their 60s and 70s.

== Risk factors ==
Hypertension and cigarette smoking are the most important risk factors, though the importance of genetic factors has been increasingly recognized. Approximately 10 percent of patients may have other family members who have aortic aneurysms. It is also important to note that individuals with a history of aneurysms in other parts of the body have a higher chance of developing a thoracic aortic aneurysm.

== Diagnosis ==
Aorta segments, with thoracic aorta in area marked in green

Thoracic aortic aneurysm is defined as a cross-sectional diameter exceeding the following cutoff:

- 4.5 cm in the United States
- 4.0 cm in South Korea

A diameter of 3.5 cm is generally considered dilated. However, average values vary with age and size of the reference population, as well as different segments of the aorta.

Upper limits of the standard reference range of the thoracic aorta in a United States population:
| | Small and young | Large and elderly |
| Ascending aorta | 3.3 cm | 4.3 cm |
| Descending aorta | 2.3 cm | 3.2 cm |

== Screening ==
Ruptured thoracic aortic aneurysm as seen on ultrasound

Guidelines were issued in March 2010 for early detection of thoracic aortic disease, by the American College of Cardiology, the American Heart Association, and other groups. Among the recommendations:

- First-degree relatives of people with thoracic aortic aneurysm or dissection should have aortic imaging to identify asymptomatic disease.
- People with symptoms suggestive of thoracic aortic dissection should be routinely evaluated "to establish a pretest risk of disease that can then be used to guide diagnostic decisions."
- People diagnosed with Marfan syndrome should immediately have an echocardiogram to measure the aorta and followed up six months later to check for aortic enlargement.

== Treatment ==
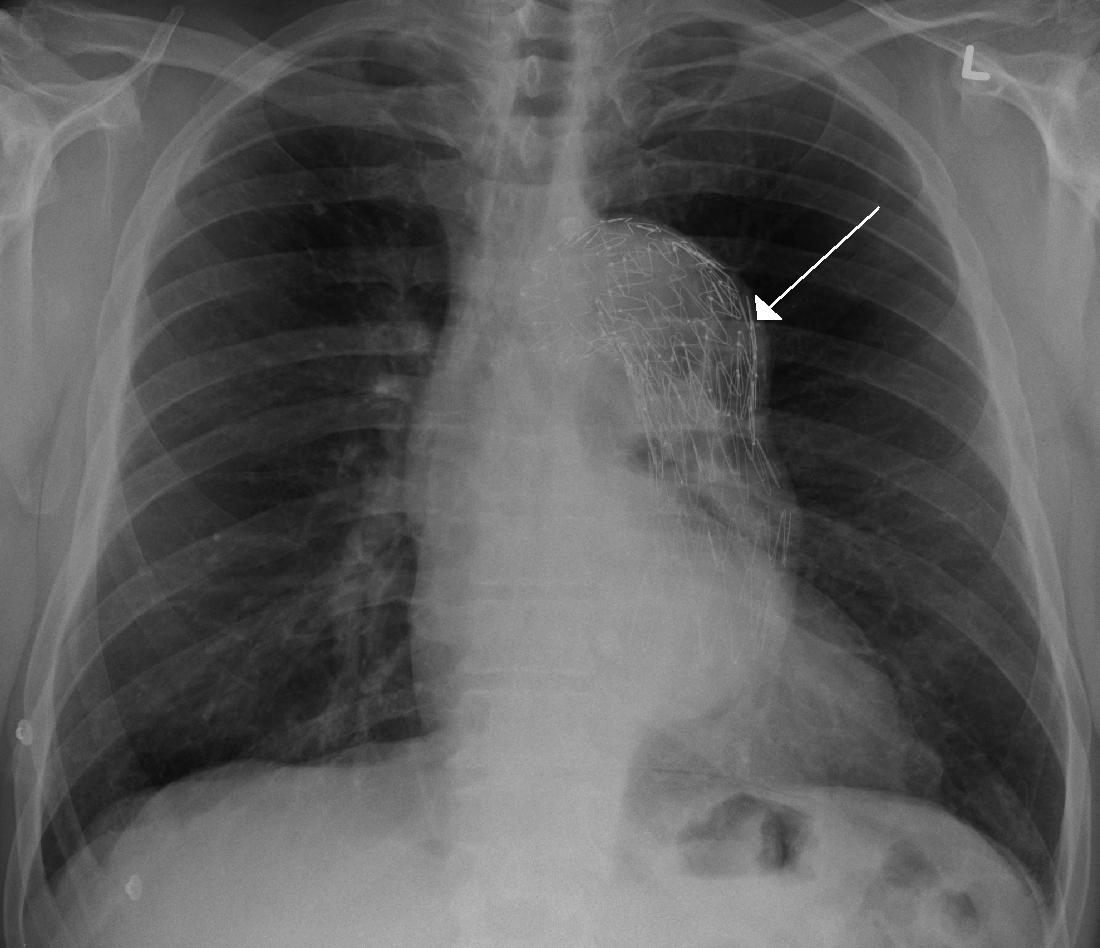
A stent graft placed in the thoracic aorta to treat a thoracic aortic aneurysm.

The size cut off for aortic aneurysm is crucial to its treatment. A thoracic aorta greater than 4.5 cm is generally defined as aneurysmal, while a size greater than 5.5 cm is the distinction for treatment, which can be either endovascular or surgical, with the former reserved for pathology at the descending aorta.

Indication for surgery may depend upon the size of the aneurysm. Aneurysms in the ascending aorta may require surgery at a smaller size than aneurysms in the descending aorta.

Treatment may be via open or via endovascular means. Open surgical repair remains the gold standard for thoracoabdominal aortic aneurysm treatment, particularly in patients with connective tissues disease. Rates of postoperative spinal cord ischaemia can be kept at low levels after open surgical repair with the adequate precautions and perioperative maneuvers.

== Epidemiology ==
Each year in the United States, some 45,000 people die from diseases of the aorta and its branches. Acute aortic dissection, a life-threatening event due to a tear in the aortic wall, affects 5 to 10 patients per million population each year, most often men between the ages of 50 and 70; of those that occur in women younger than 40, nearly half arise during pregnancy. The majority of these deaths occur as a result of complications of thoracic aneurysmal disease
