= Thoracic diaphragm =

Sheet of internal skeletal muscle

Diaphragm
- Respiratory system

Details
- Origin: L1–L3, the xiphoid process, 6–12th rib and their costal cartilages
- Insertion: Central tendon
- Artery: Pericardiacophrenic artery, musculophrenic artery, inferior phrenic arteries
- Vein: Superior phrenic vein, inferior phrenic vein
- Nerve: Phrenic and lower intercostal nerves
- Actions: assists inspiration, depresses costal cartilages

Identifiers
- Latin: diaphragma
- Greek: διάφραγμα
- MeSH: D003964
- TA98: A04.4.02.001
- TA2: 2327
- FMA: 13295

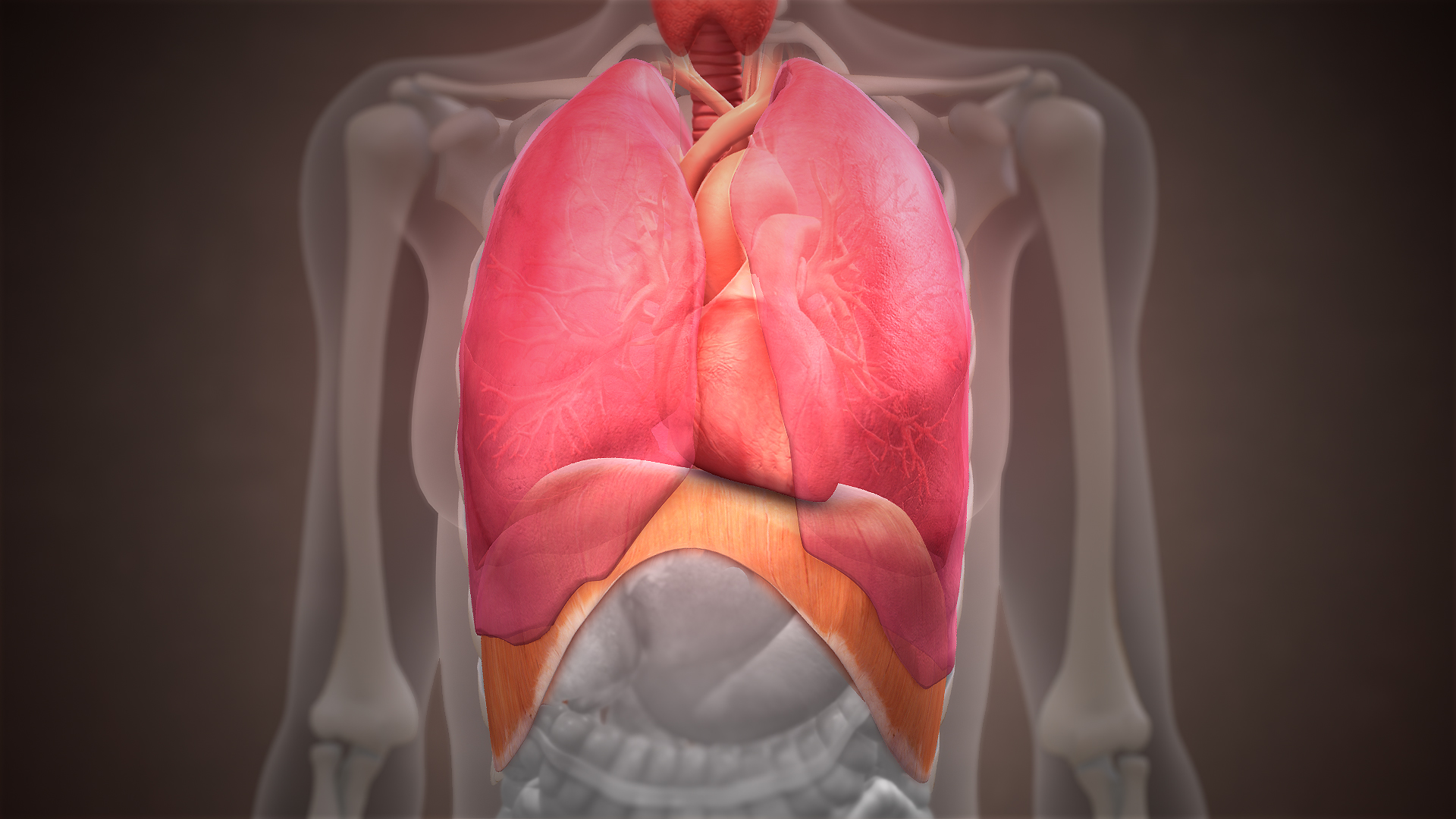
Structure of diaphragm shown using a 3D medical animation still shot

The thoracic diaphragm, or simply the diaphragm (/ˈdaɪəfræm/; Ancient Greek: διάφραγμα, romanized: diáphragma, lit. 'partition'), is a sheet of internal skeletal muscle in humans and other mammals that extends across the bottom of the thoracic cavity. The diaphragm is the most important muscle of respiration, and separates the thoracic cavity, containing the heart and lungs, from the abdominal cavity: as the diaphragm contracts, the volume of the thoracic cavity increases, creating a negative pressure there, which draws air into the lungs. Its high oxygen consumption is indicated by the many mitochondria and capillaries present; more than in any other skeletal muscle.

The term diaphragm in anatomy, created by Gerard of Cremona, can refer to other flat structures such as the urogenital diaphragm or pelvic diaphragm, but "the diaphragm" generally refers to the thoracic diaphragm. In humans, the diaphragm is slightly asymmetric—its right half is higher up (superior) to the left half, since the large liver rests beneath the right half of the diaphragm.

Other mammals have diaphragms, and other vertebrates such as amphibians and reptiles have diaphragm-like structures, but important details of the anatomy may vary, such as the position of the lungs in the thoracic cavity.

== Structure ==
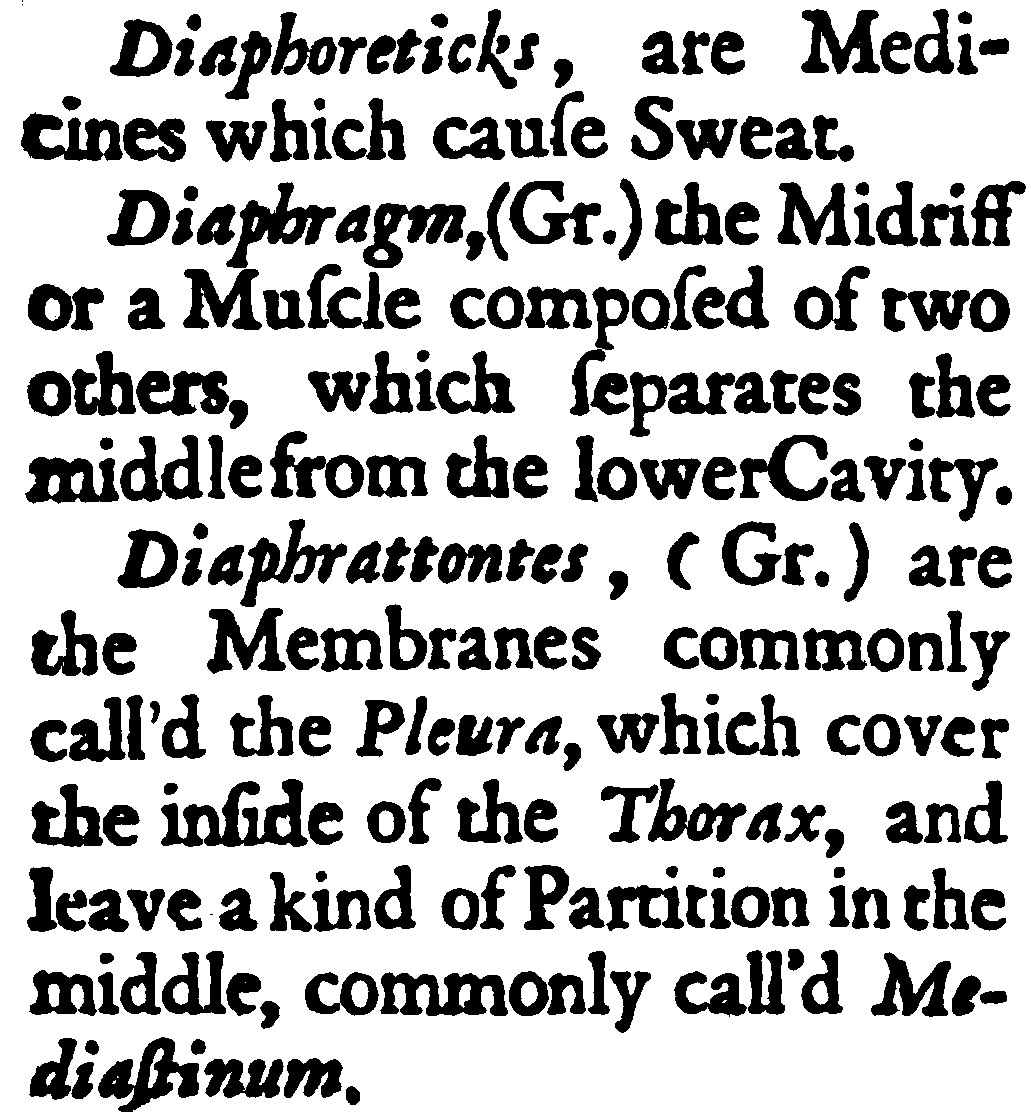
Definition of diaphragm in Blount's 1707 Glossographia Anglicana Nova

The diaphragm is an upward curved, c-shaped structure of muscle and fibrous tissue that separates the thoracic cavity from the abdomen. The superior surface of the dome forms the floor of the thoracic cavity, and the inferior surface the roof of the abdominal cavity.

As a dome, the diaphragm has peripheral attachments to structures that make up the abdominal and chest walls. The muscle fibres from these attachments converge in a central tendon, which forms the crest of the dome. Its peripheral part consists of muscular fibers that take origin from the circumference of the inferior thoracic aperture and converge to be inserted into a central tendon.

The muscle fibres of the diaphragm radiate outward from the central tendon. While the diaphragm is one muscle, it is composed of two distinct muscle regions: the costal, which serves as the driver in the work of breathing, and crural diaphragm, which serves as an "anchor;" attaching the muscle to the lower ribs and lumbar vertebrae. The costal diaphragm is further divided into ventral, medial, and dorsal costal portions.

The vertebral part of the diaphragm arises from the crura and arcuate ligaments. Right crus arises from L1-L3 vertebral bodies and their intervertebral discs. Smaller left crus arises from L1, L2 vertebral bodies and their intervertebral discs. Medial arcuate ligament arises from the fascia thickening from body of L2 vertebrae to transverse process of L1 vertebrae, crossing over the body of the psoas major muscle. The lateral arcuate ligament arises from the transverse process of L1 vertebrae and is attached laterally to the 12th rib. The lateral arcuate ligament also arises from fascia thickening that covers the quadratus lumborum muscle. The median arcuate ligament arises from the fibrous parts of right and left crura where descending thoracic aorta passes behind it. No diaphragmatic muscle arises from the median arcuate ligament. Both adrenal glands lie near the diaphragmatic crus and arcuate ligament.

The costal part of diaphragm arises from the lower four ribs (7 to 10) costal cartilages.

The central tendon of the diaphragm is a thin but strong aponeurosis near the center of the vault formed by the muscle, closer to the front than to the back of the thorax. The central part of the tendon is attached above to pericardium. The both sides of the posterior fibres are attached to paracolic gutters (the curving of ribs before attaching to both sides of the vertebral bodies).

=== Openings ===
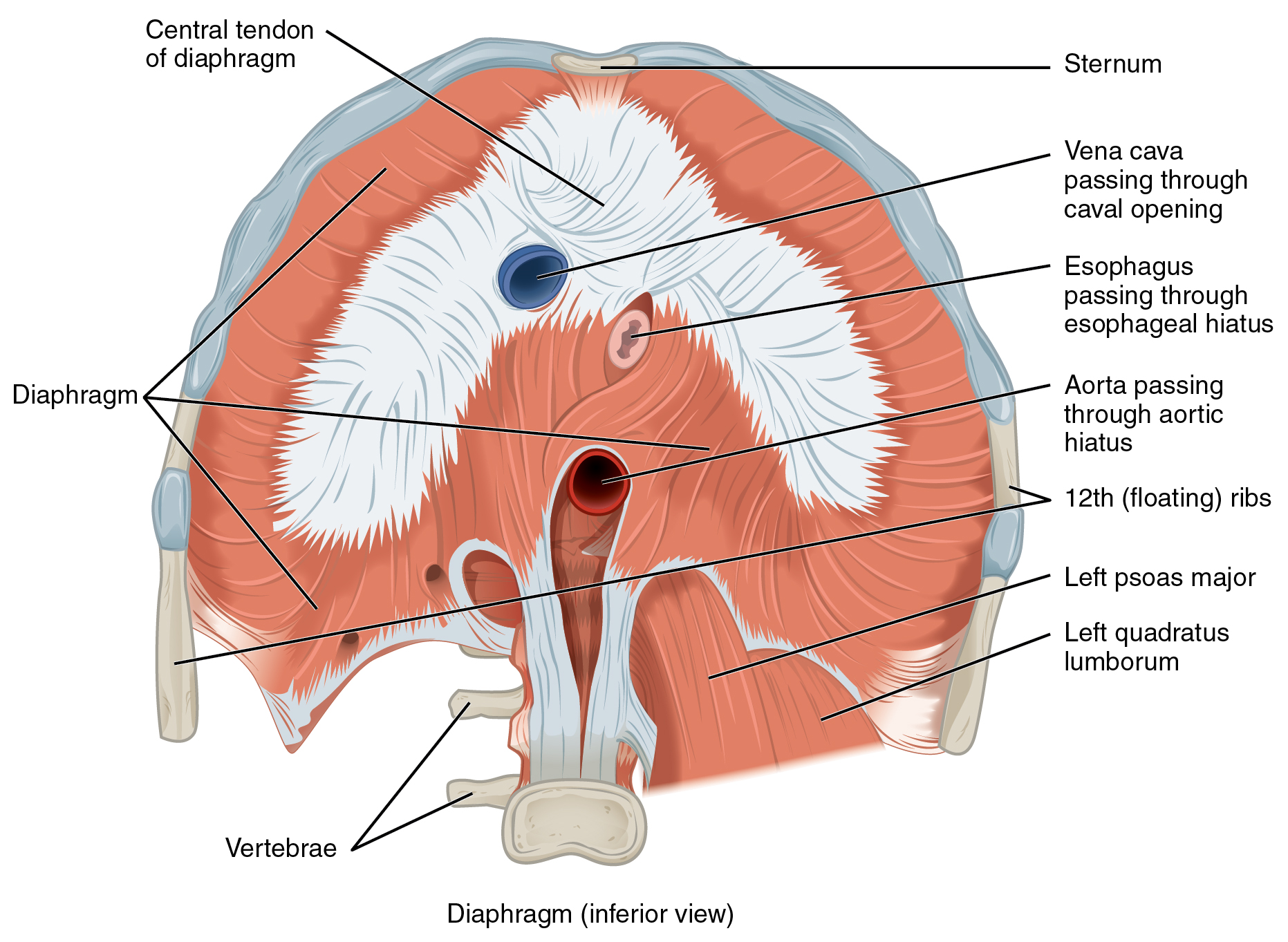
Human diaphragm, transverse view from below, showing openings

There are a number of openings in the diaphragm through which structures pass between the thorax and abdomen. There are three large openings — one for the aorta (aortic hiatus), one for the esophagus (esophageal hiatus), and one for the inferior vena cava (the caval opening), as well as a series of smaller openings.

The inferior vena cava passes through the caval opening, a quadrilateral opening at the junction of the right and middle leaflets of the central tendon, so that its margins are tendinous. Surrounded by tendons, the opening is stretched open every time inspiration occurs. However, there has been argument that the caval opening actually constricts during inspiration. Since thoracic pressure decreases upon inspiration and draws the caval blood upwards toward the right atrium, increasing the size of the opening allows more blood to return to the heart, maximizing the efficacy of lowered thoracic pressure returning blood to the heart. The aorta does not pierce the diaphragm but rather passes behind it in between the left and right crus.

There are several structures that pierce through the diaphragm, including: left phrenic nerve pierces through the central tendon, greater, lesser, and least thoracic splanchnic nerves pierces through bilateral crura, and lymphatic vessels that pierce throughout the diaphragm, especially behind the diaphragm.

Openings through the diaphragm and their content
! Description	Vertebral level	Contents
caval opening	T8	The caval opening passes through the central tendon of the diaphragm. It contains the inferior vena cava, and some branches of the right phrenic nerve. The outermost wall of inferior vena cava is fused with the central tendon.
esophageal hiatus	T10	The esophageal hiatus is situated in the posterior part of the diaphragm, located slightly left of the west central tendon through the muscular sling of the right crus of the diaphragm. It contains the esophagus, and anterior and posterior vagal trunks, left gastric artery and veins, and lymphatics.
aortic hiatus	T12	The aortic hiatus is in the posterior part of the diaphragm, between the left and right crus. It contains the aorta, the thoracic duct and Azygous vein.
Under the medial lumbocostal arch		sympathetic trunk, and least splanchic nerves
Under the lateral lumbocostal arch		Subcostal nerve and vessels
areolar tissue between the sternal and costal parts (see also foramina of Morgagni)		the superior epigastric branch of the internal thoracic artery and some lymphatics from the abdominal wall and convex surface of the liver
areolar tissue between the fibers springing from the medial and lateral lumbocostal arches		This interval is less constant; when this interval exists, the upper and back part of the kidney is separated from the pleura by areolar tissue only.

=== Nerve supply ===
The diaphragm is primarily innervated by the phrenic nerve which is formed from the cervical nerves C3, C4 and C5. While the central portion of the diaphragm sends sensory afferents via the phrenic nerve, the peripheral portions of the diaphragm send sensory afferents via the intercostal (T5–T11) and subcostal nerves (T12).

=== Blood supply ===
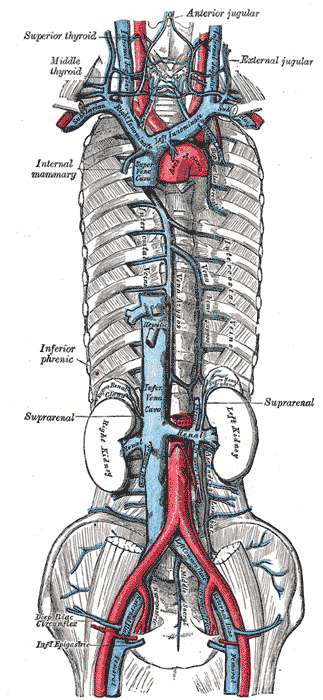

Arteries and veins above and below the diaphragm supply and drain blood.

From above, the diaphragm receives blood from branches of the internal thoracic arteries, namely the pericardiacophrenic artery and musculophrenic artery; from the superior phrenic arteries, which arise directly from the thoracic aorta; and from the lower internal intercostal arteries. From below, the inferior phrenic arteries supply the diaphragm.

The diaphragm drains blood into the brachiocephalic veins, azygos veins, and veins that drain into the inferior vena cava and left suprarenal vein.

=== Variation ===
The sternal portion of the muscle is sometimes wanting and more rarely defects occur in the lateral part of the central tendon or adjoining muscle fibers.

=== Development ===
The thoracic diaphragm develops during embryogenesis, beginning in the third week after fertilization with two processes known as transverse folding and longitudinal folding. The septum transversum, the primitive central tendon of the diaphragm, originates at the rostral pole of the embryo and is relocated during longitudinal folding to the ventral thoracic region. Transverse folding brings the body wall anteriorly to enclose the gut and body cavities. The pleuroperitoneal membrane and body wall myoblasts, from somatic lateral plate mesoderm, meet the septum transversum to close off the pericardio-peritoneal canals on either side of the presumptive esophagus, forming a barrier that separates the peritoneal and pleuropericardial cavities. Furthermore, dorsal mesenchyme surrounding the presumptive esophagus form the muscular crura of the diaphragm.

Because the earliest element of the embryological diaphragm, the septum transversum, forms in the cervical region, the phrenic nerve that innervates the diaphragm originates from the cervical spinal cord (C3,4, and 5). As the septum transversum descends inferiorly, the phrenic nerve follows, accounting for its circuitous route from the upper cervical vertebrae, around the pericardium, finally to innervate the diaphragm.

== Function ==
Real-time magnetic resonance imaging showing effects of diaphragm movement during breathing

The diaphragm is the main muscle of respiration and functions in breathing. During inhalation, the diaphragm contracts and moves in the inferior direction, enlarging the volume of the thoracic cavity and reducing intra-thoracic pressure (the external intercostal muscles also participate in this enlargement), forcing the lungs to expand. In other words, the diaphragm's movement downwards creates a partial vacuum in the thoracic cavity, which forces the lungs to expand to fill the void, drawing air in the process.

Cavity expansion happens in two extremes, along with intermediary forms. When the lower ribs are stabilized and the central tendon of the diaphragm is mobile, a contraction brings the insertion (central tendon) towards the origins and pushes the lower cavity towards the pelvis, allowing the thoracic cavity to expand downward. This is often called belly breathing. When the central tendon is stabilized and the lower ribs are mobile, a contraction lifts the origins (ribs) up towards the insertion (central tendon) which works in conjunction with other muscles to allow the ribs to slide and the thoracic cavity to expand laterally and upwards.

When the diaphragm relaxes (moves in the superior direction), air is exhaled by elastic recoil process of the lung and the tissues lining the thoracic cavity. Assisting this function with muscular effort (called forced exhalation) involves the internal intercostal muscles used in conjunction with the abdominal muscles, which act as an antagonist paired with the diaphragm's contraction. Diaphragm dysfunction is a well-known factor associated with various complications in patients, such as prolonged respiratory failure, difficulties in weaning from mechanical ventilation, extended hospitalization, increased morbidity, and mortality. Studies have reported that a thin diaphragm leads to greater lung compliance, which can contribute to respiratory failure. Furthermore, reduction in diaphragm thickness during the early stages of disease can serve as a prognostic marker in sepsis patients, and COVID-19 patients.

The diaphragm is also involved in non-respiratory functions. It helps to expel vomit, feces, and urine from the body by increasing intra-abdominal pressure, aids in childbirth, and prevents acid reflux by exerting pressure on the esophagus as it passes through the esophageal hiatus.

== Clinical significance ==
=== Paralysis ===
If either the phrenic nerve, cervical spine or brainstem is damaged, this will sever the nervous supply to the diaphragm. The most common damage to the phrenic nerve is by bronchial cancer, which usually only affects one side of the diaphragm. Other causes include Guillain–Barré syndrome and systemic lupus erythematosus.

=== Herniation ===
A hiatus hernia is a hernia in which parts of the lower esophagus or stomach that are normally in the abdomen pass abnormally through the diaphragm and are present in the thorax. Hernias are described as rolling, in which the hernia is beside the oesophagus, or sliding, in which the hernia directly involves the esophagus. These hernias are implicated in the development of reflux, as the different pressures between the thorax and abdomen normally act to keep pressure on the esophageal hiatus. With herniation, this pressure is no longer present, and the angle between the cardia of the stomach and the oesophagus disappears. Not all hiatus hernias cause symptoms, although almost all people with Barrett's oesophagus or oesophagitis have a hiatus hernia.

Hernias may also occur as a result of congenital malformation, a congenital diaphragmatic hernia. When the pleuroperitoneal membranes fail to fuse, the diaphragm does not act as an effective barrier between the abdomen and thorax. Herniation is usually of the left, and commonly through the posterior lumbocostal triangle, although rarely through the anterior foramen of Morgagni. The contents of the abdomen, including the intestines, may be present in the thorax, which may impact development of the growing lungs and lead to hypoplasia. This condition is present in 0.8 - 5/10,000 births. A large herniation has high mortality rate, and requires immediate surgical repair.

=== Imaging ===
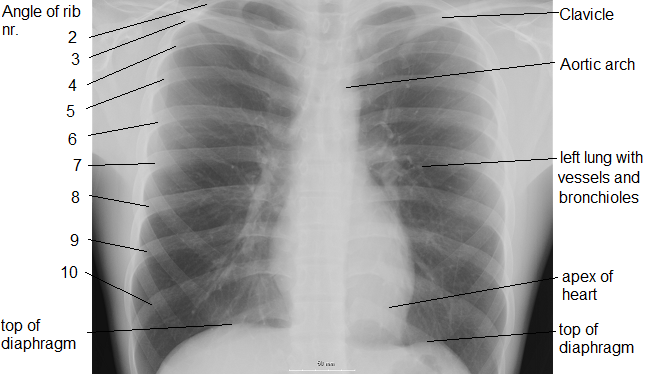
X-ray of chest, showing top of diaphragm.

Due to its position separating the thorax and abdomen, fluid abnormally present in the thorax, or air abnormally present in the abdomen, may collect on one side of the diaphragm. An X-ray may reveal this. Pleural effusion, in which there is fluid abnormally present between the two pleurae of the lungs, is detected by an X-ray of the chest, showing fluid collecting in the angle between the ribs and diaphragm. An X-ray may also be used to reveal a pneumoperitoneum, in which there is gas in the abdomen.

An X-ray may also be used to check for herniation.

== Significance in strength training ==
Some have suggested that the adoption of a deeper breathing pattern occurs during physical exercise in order to facilitate greater oxygen "absorption". However, oxygen "absorption" or more accurately, diffusion, from the pulmonary capillaries to the arterial blood occurs no matter the depth of breathing. During exercise, breathing rate and diaphragmatic work increase, which in turn increases the rate of oxygen diffusion into the arterial blood. Diaphragm position does not change anatomically during deeper breathing patterns, but rather remains lower in the zone of apposition, but does not increase oxygen diffusion. Oxygen diffusion rates only increase in response to elevated metabolic demand. The diaphragm is under voluntary and involuntary control, but during physical exercise, involuntary control is primary and correlates directly to the metabolic demand of exercise.

== Other animals ==
Diaphragm and pleural cavities in amphibian (left), bird (center), mammal (right). a, mandible; b, genio-hyoid; c, hyoid; d, sterno-hyoid; e, sternum; f, pericardium; g, septum transversum; h, rectus abdominis; i, abdominal cavity; j, pubis; k, esophagus; l, trachea; m, cervical limiting membrane of abdominal cavity; n, dorsal wall of body; o, lung; o', air-sac.

The existence of a membrane separating the pharynx from the stomach can be traced widely among the chordates. Thus the model organism, the marine chordate lancelet, possesses an atriopore by which water exits the pharynx, which has been claimed (and disputed) to be homologous to structures in ascidians and hagfishes. The tunicate epicardium separates digestive organs from the pharynx and heart, but the anus returns to the upper compartment to discharge wastes through an outgoing siphon.

Thus the diaphragm emerges in the context of a body plan that separated an upper feeding compartment from a lower digestive tract, but the point at which it originates is a matter of definition. Structures in fish, amphibians, reptiles, and birds have been called diaphragms, but it has been argued that these structures are not homologous. For instance, the alligator diaphragmaticus muscle does not insert on the esophagus and does not affect pressure of the lower esophageal sphincter. The lungs are located in the abdominal compartment of amphibians and reptiles, so that contraction of the diaphragm expels air from the lungs rather than drawing it into them. In birds and mammals, lungs are located above the diaphragm. The presence of an exceptionally well-preserved fossil of Sinosauropteryx, with lungs located beneath the diaphragm as in crocodiles, has been used to argue that dinosaurs could not have sustained an active warm-blooded physiology, or that birds could not have evolved from dinosaurs. An explanation for this (put forward in 1905), is that lungs originated beneath the diaphragm, but as the demands for respiration increased in warm-blooded birds and mammals, natural selection came to favor the parallel evolution of the herniation of the lungs from the abdominal cavity in both lineages.

However, birds lack diaphragms. They do not breathe in the same way as mammals and do not rely on creating a negative pressure in the thoracic cavity, at least not to the same extent. They rely on a rocking motion of the keel of the sternum to create local areas of reduced pressure to supply thin, membranous airsacs cranially and caudally to the fixed-volume, non-expansive lungs. A complicated system of valves and air sacs cycles air constantly over the absorption surfaces of the lungs so allowing maximal efficiency of gaseous exchange. Thus, birds do not have the reciprocal tidal breathing flow of mammals. On careful dissection, around eight air sacs can be clearly seen. They extend quite far caudally into the abdomen.

=== Os diaphragmaticum ===
In camels, a roughly triangular bone 2.5 centimetres (1 inch) in diameter is present in the centre of the diaphragm, and is termed the os diaphragmaticum. The bone ossifies endochondrally, and a cartilaginous version of it can be found in the camel foetus. It is thought to strengthen the tendonous area of the diaphragm and protect it from tearing during breathing. This function is necessary because the large size of the camel necessitates high forces on the diaphragm in order to draw breath. It is not known to be present in other artiodactyls.

== See also ==
- Diaphragmatic breathing
