= Pericardiacophrenic artery =

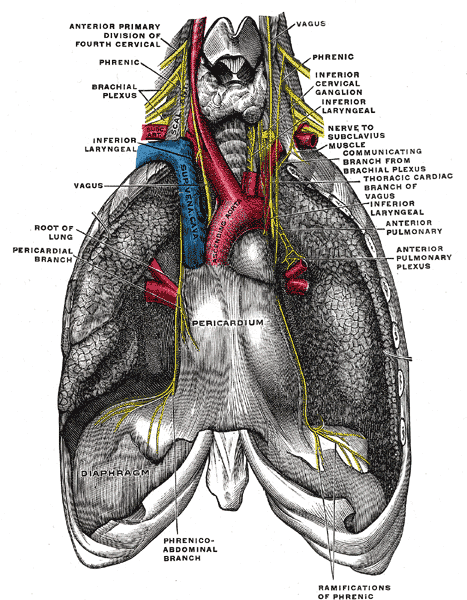
- The phrenic nerve and its relations with the vagus nerve. (Pericardiacophrenic artery not labeled, but region is visible.)

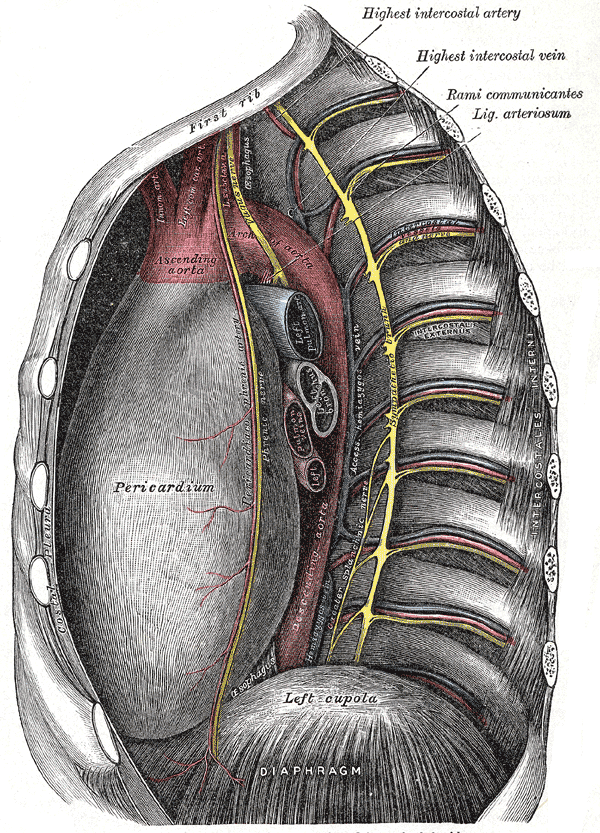
- The thoracic aorta, viewed from the left side. (Pericardiacophrenic labeled at center left.)

Details
- Source: Internal thoracic
- Vein: Pericardiacophrenic veins
- Supplies: Pericardium, thoracic diaphragm

Identifiers
- Latin: arteria pericardiacophrenica
- TA98: A12.2.08.034
- TA2: 4581
- FMA: 3964

The pericardiacophrenic artery is a long slender branch of the internal thoracic artery.

== Anatomy ==
=== Origin ===
The pericardiacophrenic artery branches from the internal thoracic artery.

=== Course ===
The pericardiacophrenic arteries travel through the thoracic cavity. They course through the fibrous pericardium. The pericardiacophrenic artery accompanies the phrenic nerve between the pleura and pericardium, to the diaphragm. This is where both the artery and the phrenic nerve are distributed.

=== Distribution ===
The pericardiacophrenic arteries provide arterial supply to the fibrous pericardium, and (along with the musculophrenic arteries) the diaphragm.

=== Anastomoses ===
It anastomoses with the musculophrenic, and superior phrenic arteries.
