= Sternocostal triangle =

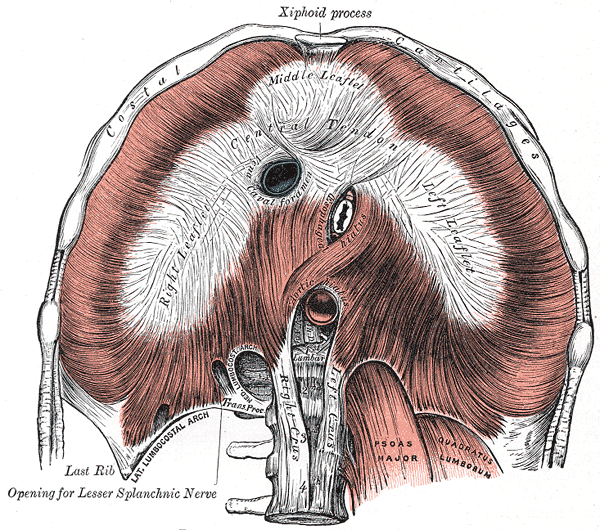
- The diaphragm. Under surface. Foramina of Morgagni not labeled, but costal and sternal attachments are visible near top.)

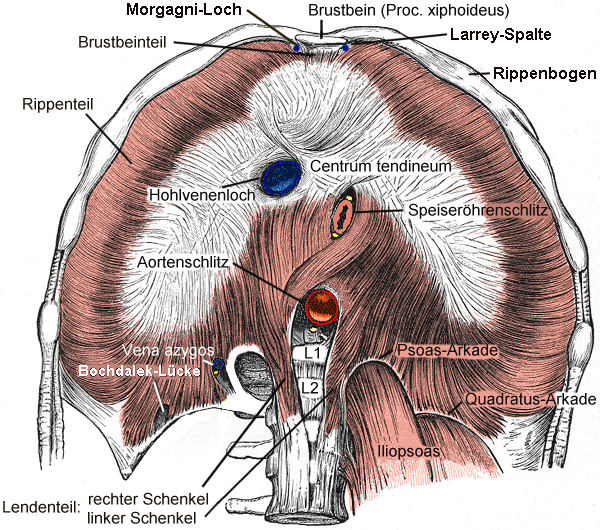
- With captions (labels in German.)

Details

Identifiers
- Latin: trigonum sternocostale
- TA98: A04.4.02.015
- FMA: 58351

The sternocostal triangle (foramina of Morgagni, Larrey's space, sternocostal hiatus, etc.) are small zones lying between the costal and sternal attachments of the thoracic diaphragm. No vascular elements are present within this space. The borders of this space are:

Medial: the lateral border of the sternal part of the diaphragm

Lateral: the medial border of the costal part of the diaphragm

Anterior: the musculoaponeurotic plane formed by a confluence of the transversus thoracis superiorly and the transversus abdominis inferiorly

The superficial epigastric artery passes in front of the aponeurotic plane that forms the anterior border and enters the abdomen anterior to the diaphragm.

== Eponym ==
It is named for Giovanni Battista Morgagni.

== Pathology ==
It can be a site of Morgagni's hernia.
