= Aortic hiatus =

Anatomical detail

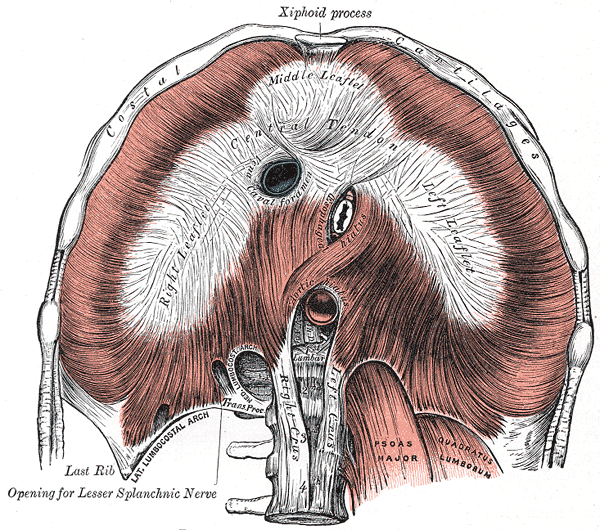
- The diaphragm. Under surface. (Aortic hiatus labeled near center.)

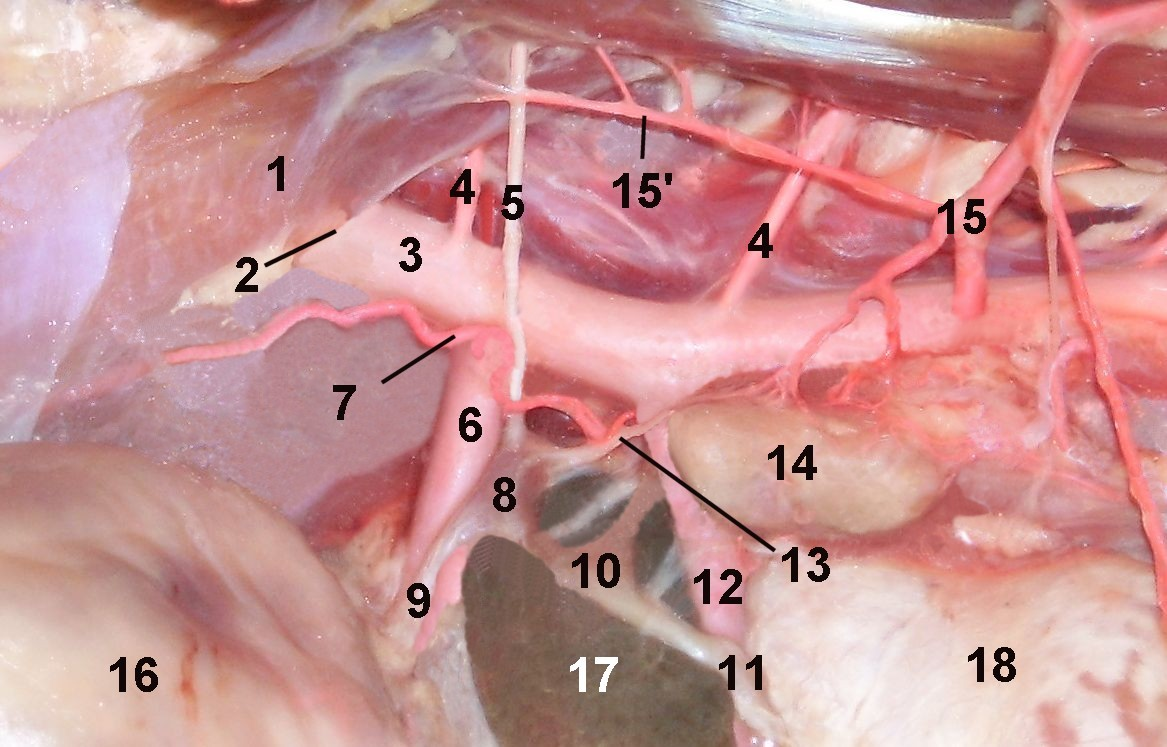
- Celiac and cranial mesenteric ganglion in a cat. 1 Crus sinistrum (Diaphragma), 2 hiatus aorticus, 3 Aorta, 4 Arteria lumbalis, 5 Nervus splanchnicus major, 6 Arteria coeliaca, 7 Arteria phrenica caudalis, 8 Ganglion coeliacum, 9 Plexus coeliacus, 10 Ganglion mesentericum craniale, 11 Plexus mesentericus cranialis, 12 Arteria mesenterica cranialis, 13 Nervus splanchnicus minor, 14 Adrenal gland, 15 Arteria abdominalis cranialis, 16 Stomach, 17 Liver (Lobus caudatus), 18 Kidney

Details

Identifiers
- Latin: hiatus aorticus
- TA98: A04.4.02.010
- TA2: 2342
- FMA: 58288

The aortic hiatus is a midline opening in the posterior part of the diaphragm giving passage to the descending aorta as well as the thoracic duct, and variably the azygos and hemiazygos veins. It is the lowest and most posterior of the large apertures.

It is located at the level of the inferior border of the twelfth thoracic vertebra (T12), posterior to the median arcuate ligament between the two crura of the diaphragm.

== Structure ==
Strictly speaking, it is not an aperture in the diaphragm but an osseoaponeurotic opening between it and the vertebral column, and therefore behind the diaphragm (meaning that diaphragmatic contractions during respiration do not directly affect aortic blood flow).

The hiatus is situated slightly to the left of the midline, and is bound anteriorly by the crura, and posteriorly by the body of the first lumbar vertebra.

Occasionally some tendinous fibers prolonged across the bodies of the vertebræ from the medial parts of the inferior ends of the crura pass posterior to the aorta, and thus convert the hiatus into a fibrous ring.

=== Contents ===
The aorta is situated on the left, the thoracic duct in the middle, and the azygos vein on the right. The hemiazygos vein may pass through the aortic hiatus or may pass through the diaphragm independently through its own foramen in the left crus.

== Additional images ==
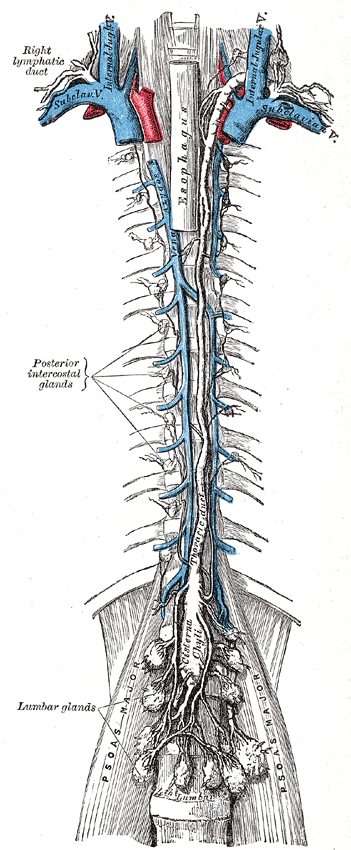
The thoracic and right lymphatic ducts.
