= Phrenic nerve =

Nerve controlling the diaphragm

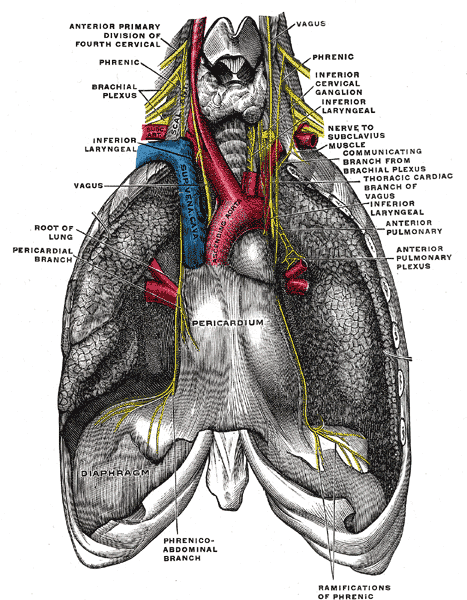
- The phrenic nerve as it passes through the thorax to supply the diaphragm.

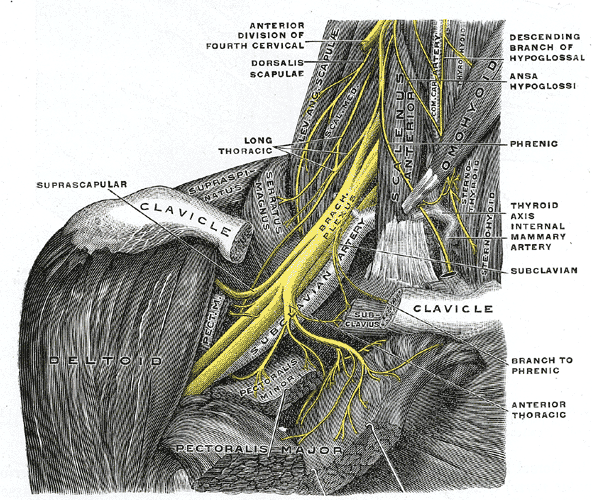
- The phrenic nerve emerges from the cervical plexus, with the right brachial plexus shown here.

Details
- From: C3–C5 of cervical plexus
- Innervates: Diaphragm

Identifiers
- Latin: nervus phrenicus
- MeSH: D010791
- TA98: A14.2.02.028
- TA2: 6380
- FMA: 6191

The phrenic nerve is a mixed nerve that originates from the C3–C5 spinal nerves in the neck. The nerve is important for breathing because it provides exclusive motor control of the diaphragm, the primary muscle of respiration. In humans, the right and left phrenic nerves are primarily supplied by the C4 spinal nerve, but there is also a contribution from the C3 and C5 spinal nerves. From its origin in the neck, the nerve travels downward into the chest to pass between the heart and lungs towards the diaphragm.

In addition to motor fibers, the phrenic nerve contains sensory fibers, which receive input from the central tendon of the diaphragm and the mediastinal pleura, as well as some sympathetic nerve fibers. Although the nerve receives contributions from nerve roots of the cervical plexus and the brachial plexus, it is usually considered separate from either plexus.

The name of the nerve comes from Ancient Greek phren 'diaphragm'.

== Structure ==
The phrenic nerve originates in the phrenic motor nucleus in the ventral horn of the cervical spinal cord. It descends obliquely with the internal jugular vein across the anterior scalene, deep to the prevertebral layer of deep cervical fascia and the transverse cervical and suprascapular arteries. On the left, the phrenic nerve crosses anterior to the first part of the subclavian artery. On the right, it lies on the anterior scalene muscle and crosses anterior to the 2nd part of the subclavian artery. On both sides, the phrenic nerve usually runs posterior to the subclavian vein as it enters the thorax where it runs anterior to the root of the lung and between the fibrous pericardium and mediastinal parietal pleura.

- The right phrenic nerve passes over the brachiocephalic artery, posterior to the subclavian vein, and then crosses the root of the right lung anteriorly and then leaves the thorax by passing through the vena caval foramen opening in the diaphragm at the level of T8. The right phrenic nerve passes over the right atrium.
- The left phrenic nerve passes over the pericardium of the left ventricle and pierces the diaphragm separately.

The pericardiacophrenic arteries and veins travel with their respective phrenic nerves.

The phrenic nerve can be marked by a line connecting these two points:

1. 1st point can be labelled 3.5 cm at the level of the thyroid cartilage from the midsagittal plane.
2. 2nd point is at the medial end of the clavicle.

=== Variation ===
As with most nerves in the neck, multiple anatomic variants have been described. Notably, there may be variability in the course of the phrenic nerve in the retro-clavicular region such that the nerve courses anterior to the subclavian vein, rather than its typical position posterior to the vein (between the subclavian vein and artery). This variant may predispose the phrenic nerve to injury during subclavian vascular cannulation.

In addition, an accessory phrenic nerve is commonly identified, present in up to 75% of a cadaveric study.

In canines, the phrenic nerve arises from C5-C7 with occasional small contributions from C4. In the cat, horse, ox, and small ruminants the phrenic nerve arises variably from C4-C7.

== Function ==
Both of these nerves supply motor fibers to the diaphragm and sensory fibers to the fibrous pericardium, mediastinal pleura, and diaphragmatic peritoneum.

Some sources describe the right phrenic nerve as innervating the gallbladder, other sources make no such mention. The right phrenic nerve may also supply the capsule of the liver.

== Clinical significance ==
Left phrenic nerve palsy (right image side) in fluoroscopy: forced inspiration with the closed mouth leads to paradox elevation of the paralytic left diaphragm while the healthy right side moves down.

Pain arising from structures supplied by the phrenic nerve is often "referred" to other somatic regions served by spinal nerves C3-C5. For example, a subphrenic abscess beneath the right diaphragm might cause a patient to feel pain in the right shoulder.

Irritation of the phrenic nerve (or the tissues it supplies) leads to the hiccup reflex. A hiccup is a spasmodic contraction of the diaphragm, which pulls air against the closed folds of the larynx.

The phrenic nerve must be identified during thoracic surgery and preserved. To confirm the identity of the phrenic nerve, a doctor may gently manipulate it to elicit a dartle (diaphragmatic startle) response. The right phrenic nerve may be crushed by the vena cava clamp during liver transplantation. Severing the phrenic nerve will paralyse that half of the diaphragm. Bilateral paralysis can be caused by spinal cord injury, motor neuron disease, infection, pneumonia, sarcoidosis, multiple sclerosis, polyneuropathy, myopathy and amyotrophy, cardiac surgery, lung transplantation, or mediastinal tumors. Diaphragm paralysis is best demonstrated by sonography. Breathing will be made more difficult but will continue provided the other nerve is intact.

The phrenic nerve arises from the neck (C3-C5) and innervates the diaphragm, which is much lower. Hence, patients suffering spinal cord injuries below the neck are still able to breathe effectively, despite any paralysis of the lower limbs.

Brachial plexus injuries can cause paralysis in various regions in the arm, forearm, and hand depending on the severed nerves.

A rare but instructive occurrence is in Rowland Payne syndrome, characterised by ipsilateral Horner’s syndrome, vocal-cord palsy and hemidiaphragm paralysis due to combined involvement of the cervical sympathetic chain, recurrent laryngeal nerve and phrenic nerve in the lower neck/thoracic inlet region.
