= Descending aorta =

- Plan of the branches.

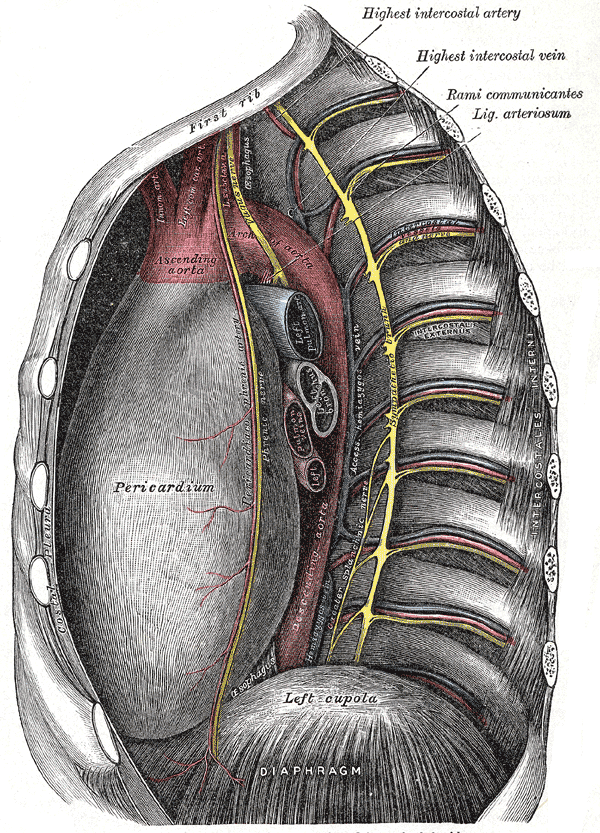
- The thoracic aorta, viewed from the left side.

Details
- Precursor: Dorsal aorta
- Source: Ascending aorta
- Branches: Thoracic aorta Abdominal aorta

Identifiers
- Latin: aorta descendens, pars descendens aortae
- TA98: A12.2.10.001
- TA2: 4185
- FMA: 3784

In human anatomy, the descending aorta is part of the aorta, the largest artery, situated in the chest. It is the continued portion of the aorta immediately following the aortic arch.

The descending aorta begins at the aortic arch and runs down through the chest and abdomen. The descending aorta anatomically consists of two portions or segments, the thoracic and the abdominal aorta, in correspondence with the two great cavities of the trunk in which it is situated. Within the abdomen, the descending aorta branches into the two common iliac arteries which serve the pelvis and, eventually, the legs.

The ductus arteriosus connects to the junction between the pulmonary artery and the descending aorta in foetal life. This artery later regresses as the ligamentum arteriosum.

== Structure ==
The descending aorta is made up of multiple parts that extend from the chest to the abdomen. The specific name changes depending on location. The descending thoracic aorta becomes the descending abdominal aorta once it reaches the diaphragm. It is preceded by the ascending aorta.

The descending aorta is composed of three layers. The inner layers is the tunica intima which regulates blood pressure. The middle layers is the media, which moves blood in one direction. The outer layer is the adventitia which provides structure and support.

The diameter of the descending aorta varies largely based on sex and age.

== Function ==
The anatomical segments of the aorta.

The aorta transports oxygenated blood from the heart to the entire body. As the aorta descends down the body, it branches into smaller arteries. The descending thoracic aorta branches into the following (descending order)

- Bronchial arteries
- Esophageal arteries
- Mediastinal arteries
- Pericardial arteries
- Superior phrenic arteries

The branches of the descending abdominal aorta include (descending order)

- Inferior phrenic arteries
- Celiac trunk arteries
- Superior mesenteric arteries
- Middle suprarenal arteries
- Renal arteries
- Gonadal arteries
- Lumbar arteries
- Inferior mesenteric arteries
- Median sacral arteries
- Common iliac arteries

== Clinical significance ==
Aortic aneurysms are the most common condition of the descending aorta. Aortic aneurysms are a bulge or swelling of the aorta due to a weak spot. A thoracic aortic aneurysm (TAA) is an aortic aneurysm occurring in the upper part of the descending aorta. An abdominal aortic aneurysm (AAA) is the most common kind of aortic aneurysm, occurring in the descending abdominal aorta. A thoracoabdominal aneurysm (TAAA) is an aneurysm that extends from the descending thoracic aorta to the descending abdominal aorta.

Another serious condition that can occur in the descending aorta is an aortic dissection, specifically type B aortic dissection. A type B dissection involves a tear in the tunica intima along the descending aorta either in the chest or the abdominal region. A pre-existing aneurysm, such as one described above, can contribute to the risk of developing type B aortic dissection. Among patients who develop uncomplicated type B aortic dissection, the maximum initial total descending aorta diameter can predict the likelihood of patients experiencing adverse events later in life or even mortality. Patients with total diameter of ≥40 mm would have higher risk than those with lower diameter.

== See also ==
- Abbott artery
