= Pleuroperitoneal =

Pleuroperitoneal is a term denoting the pleural and peritoneal serous membranes or the cavities they line. It is divided from the pericardial cavity by the transverse septum.

Congenital defect or traumatic injury of pleuroperitoneal membrane can lead to diaphragmatic hernia. A congenital pleuroperitoneal hernia is called the Bochdalek hernia. This hernia is caused by an incomplete fusion of the septum transversum with the pleuroperitoneal membranes.

== In other animals ==
Congenital pleuroperitoneal hernias have been seen in cats and dogs, but they are rare.
