= Central tendon of diaphragm =

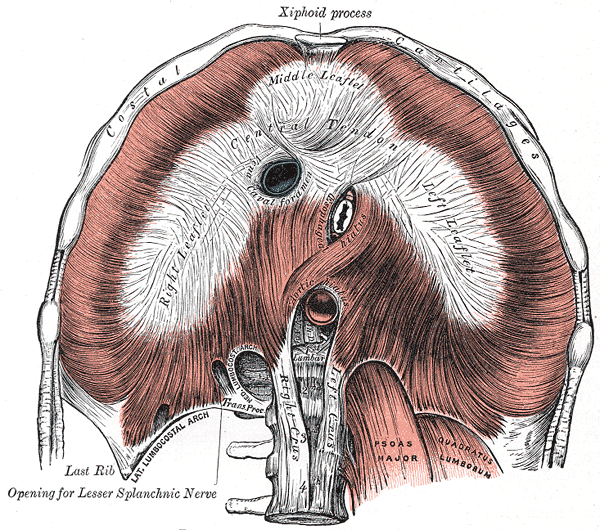
- The diaphragm. Under surface. (Central tendon visible as large white central arch.)

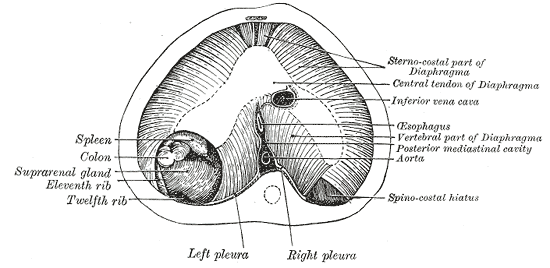
- The thoracic aspect of the diaphragm of a newly born child in which the communication between the peritoneum and pleura has not been closed on the left side; the position of the opening is marked on the right side by the spinocostal hiatus.

Details
- Precursor: Septum transversum

Identifiers
- Latin: centrum tendineum diaphragmatis
- TA98: A04.4.02.013
- TA2: 2340
- FMA: 58279

The central tendon of the diaphragm is a thin but strong aponeurosis situated slightly anterior to the vault formed by the muscle, resulting in longer posterior muscle fibers.

It is inferior to the fibrous pericardium, which fuses with the central tendon of the diaphragm via the pericardiacophrenic ligament.

The caval opening (at the level of the T8 vertebra) passes through the central tendon. This transmits the inferior vena cava and right phrenic nerve.

== Structure ==
The central tendon is shaped somewhat like a trefoil leaf, consisting of three divisions or leaflets separated from one another by slight indentations. The right leaflet is the largest, the middle (directed toward the xiphoid process) the next in size, and the left the smallest.

The central tendon is composed of several planes of fibers, which intersect one another at various angles and unite into straight or curved bundles—an arrangement which gives it additional strength.

== Action during respiration ==
During inspiration, the diaphragm contracts, causing the central tendon to be drawn inferiorly which partially flattens the domes bilaterally. The result is an increase in the thoracic volume and a reduction in intra-thoracic pressure. This reduction allows air to enter the lungs, enhancing venous return. During inspiration, the central tendon retains its shape due to its tendinous nature, and prevents constriction of the inferior vena cava.

== Clinical significance ==
Rarely, a central tendon defect may be involved in a central congenital diaphragmatic hernia. This may be repaired with thoracoscopic surgery.
