= Medial arcuate ligament =

Ligament of the diaphragm and spine

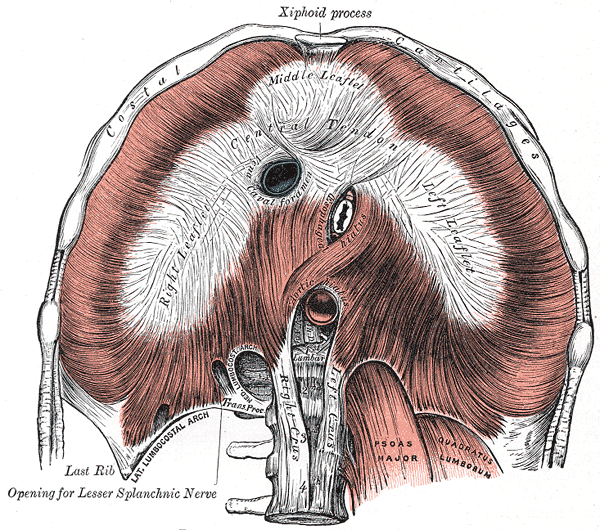
- The diaphragm. Under surface. (Med. arcuate ligament visible at bottom center left.)

Details

Identifiers
- Latin: ligamentum arcuatum mediale
- TA98: A04.4.02.006
- FMA: 58282

The medial arcuate ligament (also medial lumbocostal arch and internal arcuate ligament) is a tendinous fascia that arches over the psoas major muscle as it passes posterior the diaphragm. The purpose of the medial arcuate ligament is to attach the diaphragm to the spine (lumbar vertebra L1 - L2)

== Structure ==
The medial arcuate ligament is an arch in the fascia covering the upper part of the psoas major. It is attached to the side of the body of the first or second lumbar vertebra, laterally, it is fixed to the front of the transverse process of the first and, sometimes also, to that of the second lumbar vertebra.

It lies between the lateral arcuate ligament and the midline median arcuate ligament.

The sympathetic chain enters the abdomen by passing deep into this ligament of the diaphragm. This is in contrast to the parasympathetic vagus nerve which passes through the esophageal hiatus.
