= Superior phrenic arteries =

Superior phrenic artery

Details
- Source: Thoracic aorta
- Vein: Superior phrenic vein

Identifiers
- Latin: arteria phrenica superior
- TA98: A12.2.11.006
- TA2: 4201
- FMA: 70805

The superior phrenic artery is a bilaterally paired artery of the thoracic cavity. The two arteries provide arterial supply to the superior surface of the diaphragm. Each artery typically arises from either (the inferior portion of) the descending part of the thoracic aorta or the 10th intercostal artery. They are distributed to the posterior part of the superior surface of the diaphragm. They form anastomoses with the musculophrenic arteries, and pericardiacophrenic arteries.

== See also ==
- Inferior phrenic arteries
