= Lateral arcuate ligament =

Thoracic cavity muscle

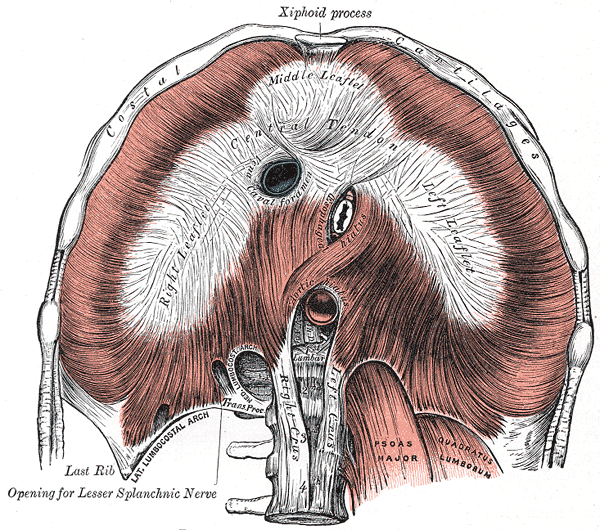
- The diaphragm. Under surface. (Lat. arcuate ligament visible at bottom left.)

Details

Identifiers
- Latin: ligamentum arcuatum laterale
- TA98: A04.4.02.007
- FMA: 58283

The lateral arcuate ligament (also lateral lumbocostal arch and external arcuate ligament) is a ligament under the diaphragm that arches across the upper part of the quadratus lumborum muscle. It is traversed by the subcostal nerve, artery and vein.

== Structure ==
The lateral arcuate ligament runs from the front of the transverse process of the first lumbar vertebra, and, laterally, to the tip and lower margin of the twelfth rib. It forms an arch over the quadratus lumborum muscle.

=== Variations ===
The lateral arcuate ligament is commonly described in anatomy textbooks as attaching at the first lumbar vertebra (L1). However, other instances have been found in cadaver studies with attachments at either the second (L2) or third (L3) lumbar vertebra.

In around 5% of people, inferolateral extensions of the lateral arcuate ligaments, such as thickened nodular areas, are found adjacent to the lateral diaphragmatic surface which can be visualized with computed tomography (CT) scans.

== History ==
The lateral arcuate ligaments were described by Galen, as early as AD 177. This was found in his animal dissections performed as part of his Rome lectures, collected in De Anatomicus Administrationibus.

== See also ==
- Medial arcuate ligament
- Median arcuate ligament
