= Lumbar veins =

Veins that drain the posterior abdominal wall

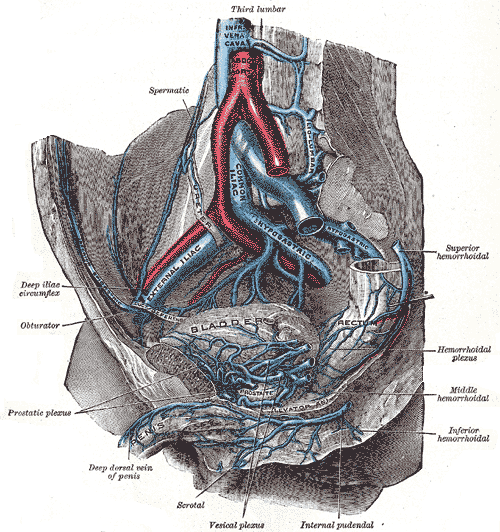
- The veins of the right half of the male pelvis. (Third lumbar labeled at center top.)

Details
- Drains to: Inferior vena cava
- Artery: Lumbar arteries

Identifiers
- Latin: venae lumbales
- TA98: A12.3.07.012; A12.3.09.003
- TA2: 4993
- FMA: 70889

The lumbar veins are four pairs of veins running along the inside of the posterior abdominal wall, and drain venous blood from parts of the abdominal wall. Each lumbar vein accompanies a single lumbar artery. The lower two pairs of lumbar veins all drain directly into the inferior vena cava, whereas the fate of the upper two pairs is more variable.

Lumbar veins are the lumbar equivalent of the posterior intercostal veins of the thorax.

== Structure ==
A lumbar vein accompanies each of the four lumbar arteries on each side of the body.

=== Distribution and tributaries ===
Collectively, the lumbar veins drain blood from the territories supplied by the corresponding lumbar arteries (the posterior, lateral, and anterior abdominal wall).

The lumbar veins drain the anterior spinal veins.

=== Fate ===
The 3rd and 4th lumbar veins drain into the inferior vena cava.

The fate of the two superior lumbar veins is far more variable, and may drain into either the inferior vena cava, ascending lumbar vein, azygos vein, or (on the left side) the left renal vein; the 1st lumbar vein often passes inferiorly to join the 2nd lumbar vein, but may less commonly drain into the ascending lumbar vein, or the azygos vein; the 2nd lumbar vein may drain directly into the inferior vena cava (at or near the level of the renal veins), but may less commonly join the 3rd lumbar vein or drain into the ascending lumbar vein.

=== Anastomoses ===
The 1st and 2nd lumbar veins are often interconnected with each other. An ascending lumbar vein additionally interconnects ipsilateral lumbar veins on each side.

The lumbar veins communicate with the external and internal vertebral venous plexuses, and form anastomoses with tributaries of the azygos vein and hemiazygos vein (posteriorly), and (anteriorly) with branches of the epigastric veins, circumflex iliac veins, and lateral thoracic veins. The anastomoses formed by the lumbar veins provide a means of collateral veinous return.

=== Relations ===
The lumbar veins are venae comitantes of the lumbar arteries. Each lumbar vein lies superior to its adjacent/corresponding lumbar artery (the same arrangement as in the intercostal neurovascular bundles).

All of the lumbar veins lie posterior to the ipsilateral sympathetic trunk.

Bilateral asymmetry

On the left side, the 3rd and 4th lumbar veins pass posterior to the abdominal aorta to reach the inferior vena cava (which is displaced to the right of the midline); thus, the left 3rd and 4th lumbar veins are longer than the corresponding contralateral two lumbar veins.

=== Variation ===
There is variation in which lumbar veins drain to the inferior vena cava and which drain to the ascending lumbar vein, the azygos vein, and the hemiazygos vein. A left lumbar vein may drain into the left renal vein.

== Clinical significance ==
During central venous catheterisation of the inferior vena cava, the catheter may enter a lumbar vein. The catheter may need to be repositioned.

== See also ==
- Posterior intercostal veins
- Subcostal vein
- Ascending lumbar vein
