= Intercostal vessels =

Intercostal vessels may refer to:

Intercostal arteries

- Posterior intercostal arteries
- Highest intercostal artery
- Anterior intercostal branches of internal thoracic artery

Intercostal veins

- Supreme intercostal vein
- Superior intercostal vein
- Posterior intercostal veins
