= Cardinal vein =

Cardinal vein may refer to:

- Anterior cardinal veins, which contribute to the formation of the internal jugular veins
- Common cardinal veins
- Posterior cardinal veins
