= Intercostal veins =

Veins between the ribs

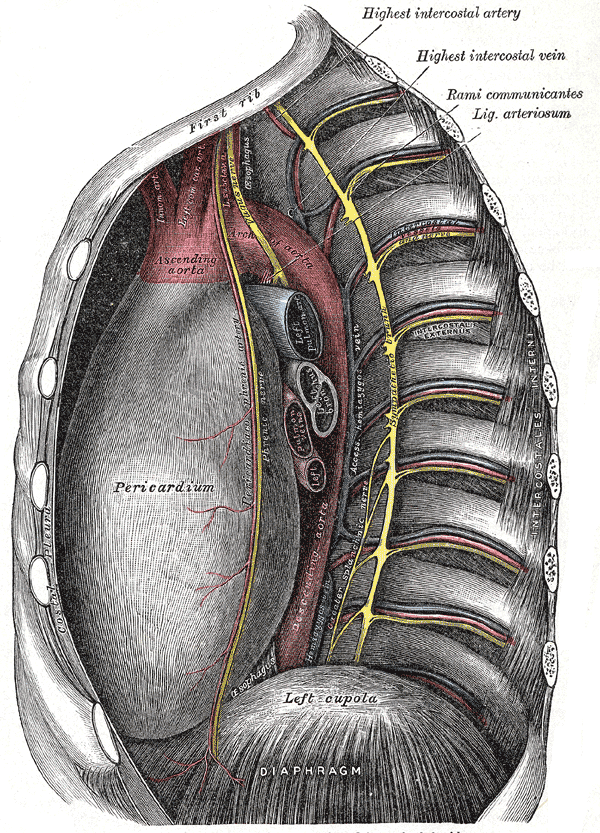
- Intercostal spaces, viewed from the left.

Details
- Drains from: Intercostal muscle, intercostal space
- Artery: Intercostal arteries

Identifiers
- Latin: venae intercostales

The intercostal veins are a group of veins which drain the area between the ribs ("costae"), called the intercostal space.

They can be divided as follows:

- Anterior intercostal veins
- Posterior intercostal veins
  - Posterior intercost vein that drain into the Supreme intercostal vein - 1st intercostal space
  - Posterior intercost veins that drain into the Superior intercostal vein - 2nd, 3rd, and 4th intercostal spaces. The superior intercostal vein then drains into the Azygous vein.
  - Posterior intercost veins that drain directly into the Azygous vein - in spaces 5–11.
  - Subcostal vein—below bottom (12th) rib and also drains into the Azygous vein.

== See also ==
- Intercostal nerves
