= Brachiocephalic =

Brachiocephalic can refer to the following:

- The brachiocephalic artery supplies blood to the right arm, head and neck.
- The left and right brachiocephalic veins merge to form the superior vena cava, one of the primary pathways by which blood is returned to the heart.
- Brachiocephalic is not an alternate spelling but misspelling of brachycephalic, a grouping within the cephalic index describing "short headed" animals or persons. A common use of this term is in describing pug-nosed dogs.
