= Congenital stenosis of vena cava =

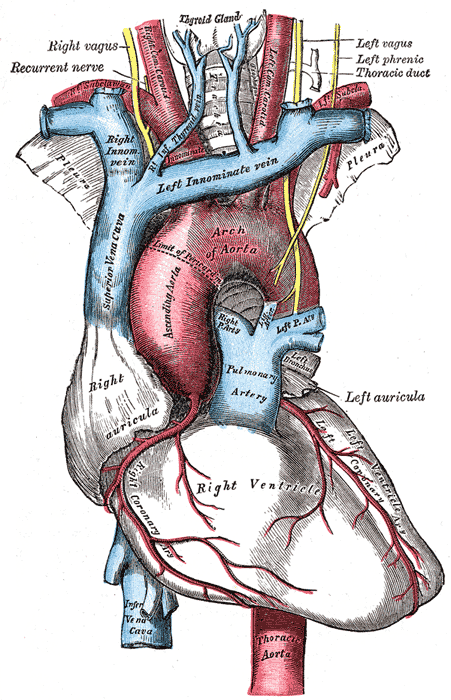
- Superior and inferior vena cava(on left)
- Specialty: Medical genetics

Congenital stenosis of vena cava is a congenital anomaly in which the superior vena cava or inferior vena cava has an aberrant interruption or coarctation.

In some cases, it can be asymptomatic, and in other cases it can lead to fluid accumulation and cardiopulmonary collapse.

== Symptoms and signs ==
Congenital heart defects may not show signs or symptoms until later stages of the child's life and have a delayed diagnosis. Congenital stenosis of the inferior vena cava is asymptomatic in many patients. Adolescent males with the condition have shown to presents with symptoms such as spontaneous lower extremity DVT, leg swelling, leg pain, varices in the lower extremities, hepatic thrombosis and hematochezia. Chylothorax has been observed rarely as a symptom of congenital stenosis of the superior vena cava in infant patients. Chylothorax results as a rare complication in which chyle leaks into the thoracic space following direct incidental damage and can also lead to increased thoracic duct pressure. Chylothorax leakage commonly occurs in patients with additional complex congenital heart lesions, increasing the risk of underlying vascular anomalies. Other symptoms which may become present later than adolescence includes venous hypertension, post necrotic hepatic cirrhosis and portal hypertension from the manifestation of the condition.

== Diagnosis ==
Congenital stenosis of the vena cava is a sub-classification of the overarching spectrum of congenital heart disease involving the vessels surrounding the heart resulting in disruption to normal cardiovascular blood flow. Diagnosis commonly occurs in early adolescence, expressed as symptoms such as deep vein thrombosis (DVT) occurring spontaneously. The mainstay diagnosis of the presenting DVT symptom is an ultrasound with venous Doppler. Ultrasound with venous Doppler rarely identifies the inferior vena cava anomalies present from birth. Difficulties in identifying the congenital stenosis of the vena cava makes diagnosis uncommon. Diagnosis of congenital stenosis of the inferior vena cava can be rarely discovered through abdominal CT examinations, and may present with an array of clinical findings dependent on the drainage patterns of the individuals. Further diagnostic tools such as a transthoracic echocardiogram can reveal the narrowing of the vena cava showing a low velocity of flow. Congenital stenosis of the vena cava can also present as acute respiratory failure and effusion of the right lung on chest X-rays.

== Treatments ==
Treatments may not be necessary for the congenital heart defect. If required, treatments can include medication, catheter procedures, corrective surgery and heart transplants dependent on the severity of the defect, age of the patient and patient's general health. Symptomatic relief of venous hypertension, associated with the congenital heart defect, can be achieved through surgery as it reduces the likelihood of hepatic vein thrombosis. Intravascular stents are a treatment method for Congenital Stenosis of the Vena Cava. Expandable metallic stents have been used as part of a procedure to dilate and maintain stenotic vena cava. Experiments carried out on mongrel dogs resulted in some failures for dilation and early migration, and occlusion complications in patients. Immediate relief of persisting symptoms occurred in two patients.

Double balloon dilation is another technique used to treat stenosis of the vena cava. Double balloon dilation involves catheters inserted in the left and right femoral vessels placed parallel to stenotic lesions and inflated simultaneously. The two balloon technique creates a substantial decrease in pressure gradients by achieving greater dilation from the use of two smaller balloons as opposed to a single large balloon. Balloons are inflated and deflated repeatedly to reduce the resistance of the vessels to inflation. Once the balloons are removed an end-hole catheter is passed over the wires to ensure a moderate systemic pressure drop occurs and then a stent is placed. Substantial pressure drops are common following single balloon dilation procedures.

Hydrophilic catheter treatments can also be used through placement of the catheter through the femoral veins to access the stenosis in the vena cava to measure haemodynamic and angiography. Angiography allows for visualisation of the stenosis in the vena cava and measurements of the pressures and length of narrowing can be obtained from the technique, including the narrowest diameter of the stenosis. Balloon angioplasties can also be performed in the narrowed vena cava using Sterling balloons. Dilations are also performed with higher pressure Dorado balloons, using the same wire as the Sterling balloon. Sustained results of increased flow and significant reduction in obstructions following stent implantation occurs from balloon angioplasty treatments.

== Epidemiology ==
Congenital stenosis of the vena cava is a rare congenital heart disease affecting 0.7 - 8.7% of the population. Vena cava anomalies are very rare and arise from incorrect development in the foetal heart. The genetic occurrence leading to this condition is unknown but current studies identified the disease symptoms presents predominantly in adolescent males. Prevalence of the condition is very low as stenotic anomalies in vena cavae development are uncommon. Recognition of vena cava anomalies is difficult and can result in minor complications if left unrecognised. Surgery is carried out for presenting symptoms associated with the condition. Difficulties in diagnosis contribute to the low incident rates as many people live asymptomatically with this disease for many years, having no impact on the patients’ life.
