= Thoracic vein =

Thoracic vein may refer to:

- Internal thoracic vein
- Lateral thoracic vein
