= John Marshall (surgeon) =

English surgeon and teacher of anatomy (1818–1891)

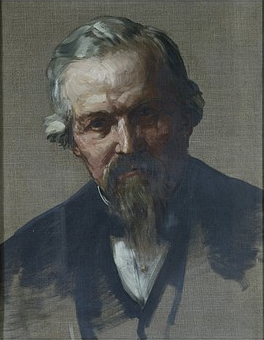
- Portrait of Marshall by Alphonse Legros
- Born: 11 September 1818; Ely, Cambridgeshire, England
- Died: 1 January 1891 (aged 72); Belle Vue House, Chelsea, London, England
- Resting place: Ely public cemetery 52.4038°N 0.2732°E
- Education: University College London
- Occupations: Surgeon, teacher of anatomy
- Known for: Galvanocautery; Circular hospital wards; Vein of Marshall; Vestigial fold of Marshall
- Title: MRCS (9 August 1844); LSA (1846); FCRS (7 December 1849); FRS (11 June 1857); Fullerian Professor of Physiology (1862–1865); President of the Royal Medical and Chirurgical Society (1882–1883); President of the GMC (1887); Hon. M.Ch., RUI (1887); LL.D., Edin.
- Spouse: Ellen Rogers (1854–1891)
- Children: Two sons, two daughters

John Marshall FRS FRCS (11 September 1818 – 1 January 1891) was an English surgeon and teacher of anatomy.

== Early life and education ==
John Marshall was born in Ely, Cambridgeshire. He was the second son and third child of the solicitor William Marshall (1776–1842) and Ann Cropley (c. 1793–1861), his second wife. Marshall entered University College, London, in 1838.

== Career ==
In 1847 Marshall was appointed assistant-surgeon at University College hospital, becoming in 1866 surgeon and professor of surgery. He was professor of anatomy at the Royal Academy from 1873 until his death. In 1883 he was president of the College of Surgeons, also Bradshaw lecturer (on "Nerve-stretching for the relief or cure of pain"), Hunterian orator in 1885, and Morton lecturer in 1889.

Regarding Marshall's skills as a teacher and lecturer, the opinions of his former students appear to have diverged. One of them, Sir Edward Albert Sharpey-Schafer, described him as "a good surgeon of the old school" and as "a good friend" for whom he had "great respect and liking" but also as an "uninspiring teacher" whose lectures were "desperately dull". However, another former student, Sir John Tweedy, strongly disagreed with Schafer and described Marshall's lectures as "informative and thought-awakening" and Marshall himself as "a cultured, critical and scientific surgeon, ever ready to try new paths and explore avenues of fresh knowledge".

Sir William MacCormac wrote in his volume on the Centenary of the College of Surgeons (1900):

Marshall's fame, rests on the great ability with which he taught anatomy in relation to art, on the introduction into modern surgery of the galvano-cautery, and on the operation for the excision of varicose veins. He was one of the first to show that cholera might be spread by means of drinking water, and issued a report on the outbreak of cholera in Broad Street, St James's, 1854. He also invented the system of circular wards for hospitals, and to him are largely owing the details of the modern medical student's education.

== Publications ==
The Outlines of Physiology (1867)

Academic offices
Preceded by Richard Owen	Fullerian Professor of Physiology; 1862–1865	Succeeded by Thomas Henry Huxley
