= Posterior intercostal =

Posterior intercostal may refer to:

- Posterior intercostal arteries
- Posterior intercostal veins
