= Fold of left vena cava =

Fold of the left vena cava
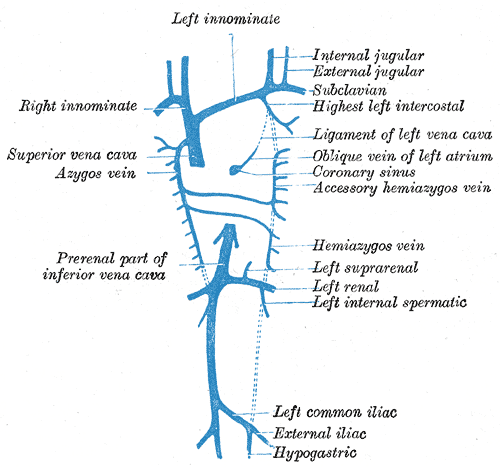
- Diagram showing completion of development of the parietal veins.

Details

Identifiers
- Latin: plica venae cavae sinistrae, ligamentum venae cavae sinistrae
- TA98: A12.1.08.010
- TA2: 3352
- FMA: 7224

The fold of the left vena cava, ligament of the left vena cava, or vestigial fold of Marshall, is a triangular fold of the serous pericardium that lies between the left pulmonary artery and subjacent pulmonary vein.

It is formed by the folding of the serous layer over the remnant of the lower part of the left superior vena cava (duct of Cuvier), which becomes obliterated during fetal life, and remains as a fibrous band stretching from the highest left intercostal vein to the left atrium, where it is continuous with a small cardiac vein, the vein of the left atrium (oblique vein of Marshall), which opens into the coronary sinus.
