= Posterior cardinal vein =

Blood vessel

- Scheme of arrangement of parietal veins.

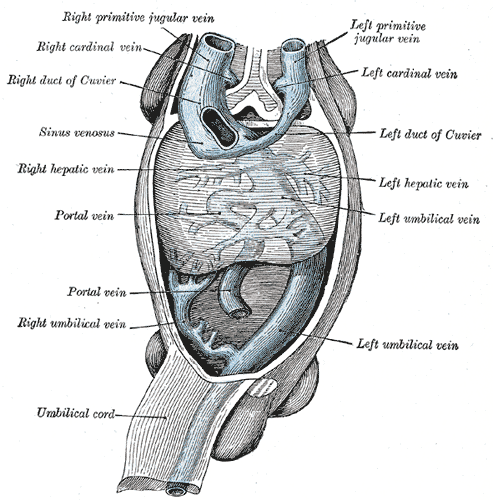
- Human embryo with heart and anterior body-wall removed to show the sinus venosus and its tributaries.

Details
- Carnegie stage: 13
- System: Cardiovascular system

Identifiers
- Latin: vena postcardinalis
- TE: cardinal vein_by_E5.11.2.2.2.2.19 E5.11.2.2.2.2.19

The posterior cardinal veins or postcardinal veins join with the corresponding right and left cardinal veins to form the left common cardinal veins, which empty in the sinus venosus. In the development of a human embryo, most of the posterior cardinal veins regress, and what remains of them forms the renal segment of the inferior vena cava and the common iliac veins. Later in the development stages, the posterior cardinal veins are replaced by the subcardinal and supracardinal veins. The subcardinal veins form part of the inferior vena cava, the renal veins and the gonadal veins. The supracardinal veins form part of the inferior vena cava, the intercostal veins, the hemiazygos vein and the azygos vein.

== Additional images ==
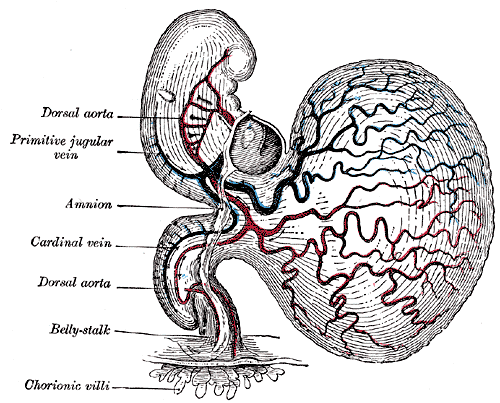
Human embryo of about fourteen days, with yolk-sac.

== See also ==
- Anterior cardinal vein
