= Lateral thoracic artery =

Large blood vessel

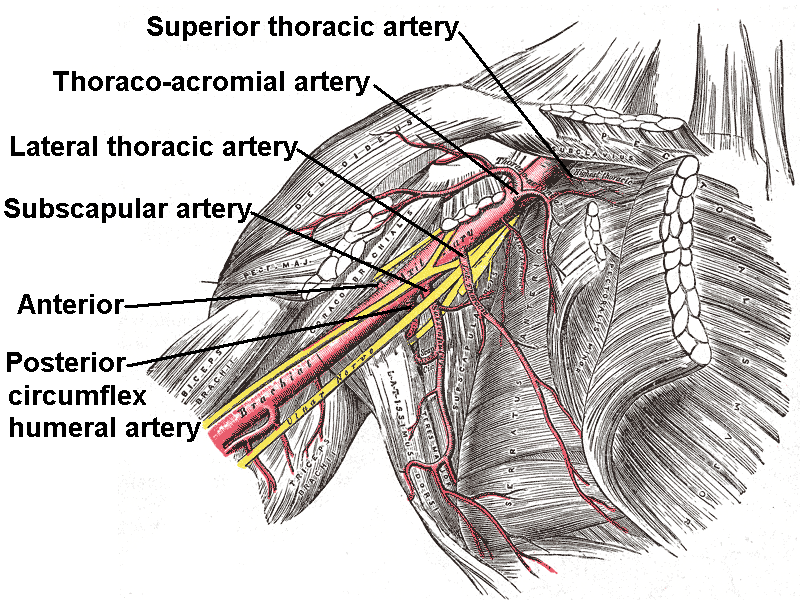
- Axillary artery, with its branches, including the lateral thoracic artery. Anterior view of right upper limb and thorax.

Details
- Source: Axillary artery
- Vein: Lateral thoracic vein
- Supplies: Serratus anterior muscle

Identifiers
- Latin: arteria thoracica lateralis
- TA98: A12.2.09.011
- TA2: 4625
- FMA: 22674

In the human body, the lateral thoracic artery (or external mammary artery) is a blood vessel that supplies oxygenated blood to approximately one-third of the lateral structures of the thorax and breast.

It originates from the axillary artery and follows the lower border of the pectoralis minor muscle to the side of the chest to supply the serratus anterior muscle, pectoralis major muscle and pectoralis minor muscle, and sends branches across the axilla to the axillary lymph nodes and subscapularis muscle.

It anastomoses with the internal thoracic artery, subscapular, and intercostal arteries, and with the pectoral branch of the thoracoacromial artery.

In the female it supplies an external mammary branch which turns round the free edge of the pectoralis major and supplies the breasts.

== Variations ==
Variations in the Axillary Artery are quite common.

Differences in its origin, course, branching pattern, and size may cause variations in the number or arrangement of branches arising from the artery. Additionally, anatomical variations such as accessory or duplicated lateral thoracic arteries have been reported in medical literature. These variations can impact surgical procedures and diagnostic imaging interpretations.

In case it is absent the lateral perforating branches of Intercostal arteries take its place.
