= Internal thoracic vessels =

Internal thoracic vessels may refer to:

- Internal thoracic artery
- Internal thoracic vein
