= Ascending lumbar vein =

Vein on the vertebral column

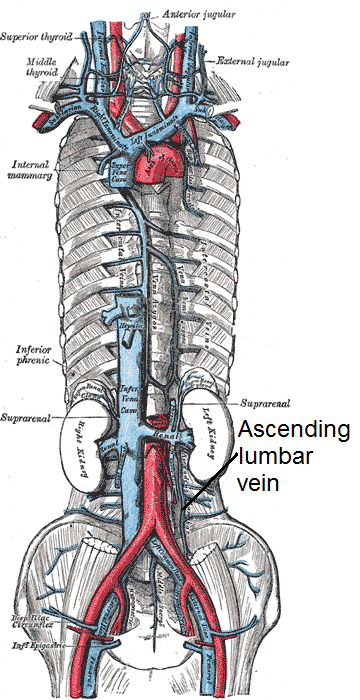
- The venae cavae and azygos veins with their tributaries.

Details
- Drains from: Lateral sacral veins
- Drains to: Azygos vein and hemiazygos vein

Identifiers
- Latin: vena lumbalis ascendens
- FMA: 12858

The ascending lumbar vein is a vein that runs up through the lumbar region on the side of the vertebral column.

== Structure ==
The ascending lumbar vein is a paired structure (i.e. one each for the right and left sides of the body). It starts at the common iliac veins. It runs superiorly, intersecting with the lumbar veins as it crosses them. It passes behind the psoas major muscle, but in front of the lumbar vertebrae.

When the ascending lumbar vein crosses the subcostal vein, it becomes one of the following:

- the azygos vein (in the case of the right ascending lumbar vein).
- the hemiazygos vein (in the case of the left ascending lumbar vein).

The first and second lumbar veins ends in the ascending lumbar vein (the third and fourth lumbar veins open into the posterior aspect of the inferior vena cava)

== Clinical significance ==
Contrast medium may be injected into the ascending lumbar vein via the femoral vein in order to visualise the spinal canal.

The ascending lumbar vein may be punctured during catheterisation. This can cause bleeding into the dural space.

== See also ==
Lumbar veins
