= Azygoesophageal recess =

Anatomical space in the right lung

The azygoesophageal recess is a right posterior mediastinal recess into which the medial edge of the right lower lobe extends. It is bounded superiorly by the azygos arch, posteriorly by the azygos vein and the pleura anterior to the vertebral column, and medially by the esophagus and adjacent mediastinal structures.

== Imaging appearance ==
On a frontal chest radiograph, the azygoesophageal recess is seen as a vertically oriented space between the right lower lobe and the adjacent mediastinum. Superiorly, the interface normally forms a smooth arc with convexity to the left. Disappearance or distortion of part of this interface suggests disease, such as subcarinal lymphadenopathy.

On CT, the recess is important because small lesions located in the recess may be invisible on chest radiographs.
