= Anterior cardinal vein =

Blood vessel

- Scheme of arrangement of parietal veins

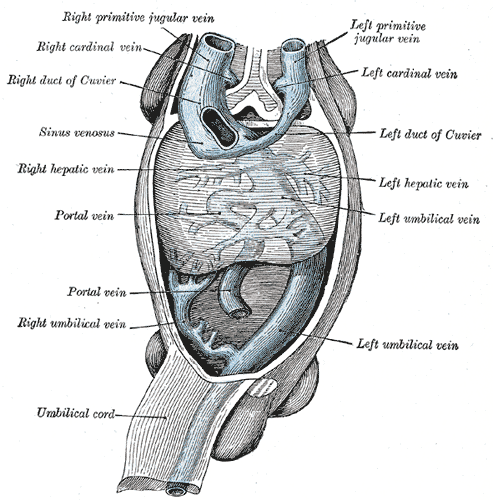
- Human embryo with heart and anterior body-wall removed to show the sinus venosus and its tributaries.

Details
- Carnegie stage: 13
- Gives rise to: Internal jugular veins and superior vena cava
- System: Cardiovascular system

Identifiers
- Latin: venae precardinalis
- TE: cardinal vein_by_E5.11.2.2.2.2.2 E5.11.2.2.2.2.2

The anterior cardinal veins (precardinal veins) contribute to the formation of the internal jugular veins and together with the common cardinal vein form the superior vena cava.

The anastomosis between the two anterior cardinal veins develops into the left brachiocephalic vein.

== Additional images ==
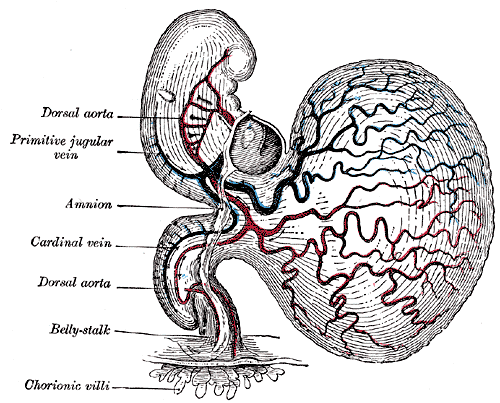
Human embryo of about fourteen days, with yolk sac.

== See also ==
- Posterior cardinal vein
