= Thoracoepigastric vein =

Large blood vessel

Details
- Drains to: Lateral thoracic vein, femoral vein

Identifiers
- Latin: vena thoracoepigastrica

The thoracoepigastric vein runs superiorly within the subcutaneous tissue of the lateral aspect of the trunk between the superficial epigastric vein below and the lateral thoracic vein above and establishes an important communication between the femoral vein and axillary vein. This is an especially important vein when the inferior vena cava (IVC) becomes obstructed, by providing a means of collateral venous return. It creates a cavocaval anastomosis by connecting with superficial epigastric veins arising from femoral vein just below inguinal ligament.

== Clinical significance ==
The thoracoepigastric vein is unique in that it drains to both the superior vena cava (SVC) and to the inferior vena cava (IVC). Hence, it serves as an anastomotic caval-caval link between the two. Furthermore, the thoracoepigastric vein is connected to the portal vein via the paraumbilical vein and thereby serves as a portocaval anastomosis as well. When a patient experiences portal hypertension, there can be congestion (backup) of blood that enters into the caval system via the thoracoepigastric vein. When this occurs, there can be an externally visible dilation of the paraumbilical (and perhaps even the thoracoepigastric veins) which leads to the appearance of "Caput Medusae". Caput medusae is a clinical sign that is recognized by the physician by the characteristic appearance of distended veins emanating from the umbilicus of the patient. The shape of these veins and their arrangement around the umbilicus is said to resemble the snake-like hair of the mythological Greek Monster, Medusa. "Caput Medusae" [Latin] means "Head of Medusa".
