= Thymic branches of internal thoracic artery =

Details
- Source: Internal thoracic artery
- Vein: Thymic veins
- Supplies: Thymus

Identifiers
- Latin: rami thymici arteriae thoracicae internae
- TA98: A12.2.08.031
- TA2: 4578
- FMA: 71514

The thymic branches of internal thoracic artery are arteries that supply the thymus.
