= Accessory hemiazygos vein =

Vein in the human body

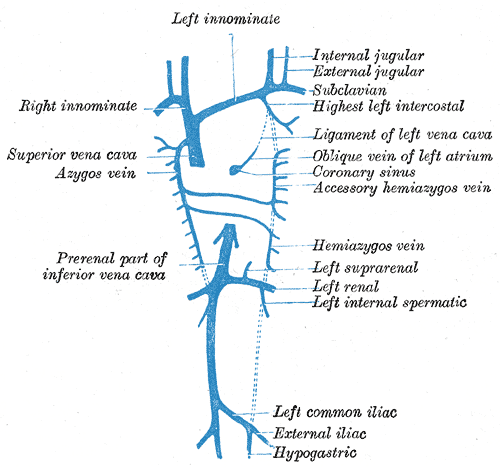
- Diagram showing completion of development of the parietal veins (accessory hemiazygos vein visible at center-left)

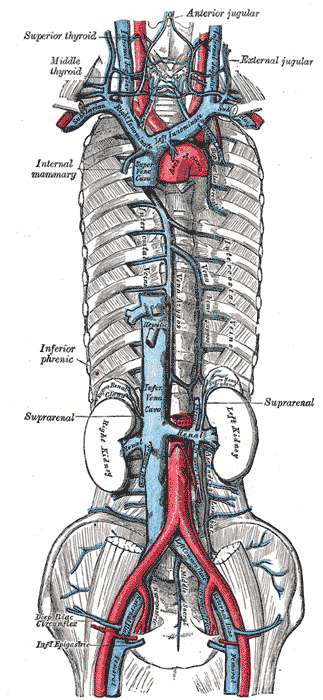
- The venae cavae and azygos veins, with their tributaries

Details
- Drains to: Hemiazygos vein, azygos vein

Identifiers
- Latin: vena hemiazygos accessoria, vena azygos minor superior
- TA98: A12.3.07.005
- TA2: 4758
- FMA: 5011

The accessory hemiazygos vein, also called the superior hemiazygous vein, is a vein on the left side of the vertebral column that generally drains the fourth through eighth intercostal spaces on the left side of the body.

== Structure ==
The accessory hemiazygos vein varies inversely in size with the left superior intercostal vein.

It usually receives the posterior intercostal veins from the 4th, 5th, 6th, 7th, and 8th intercostal spaces between the left superior intercostal vein and highest tributary of the hemiazygos vein; the left bronchial vein sometimes opens into it.

The vein usually crosses the body of the eighth thoracic vertebra to join the azygos vein. Alternatively, it ends in the hemiazygos vein.

When this vein is small, or altogether absent, the left superior intercostal vein may extend as low as the fifth or sixth intercostal space.
