= Perforating branches of internal thoracic artery =

Details
- Source: Internal thoracic artery

Identifiers
- Latin: rami perforantes arteriae thoracicae internae
- TA98: A12.2.08.036
- TA2: 4583
- FMA: 71519

The perforating branches of the internal thoracic artery pierce through the internal intercostal muscles of the superior six intercostal spaces. These small arteries run with the anterior cutaneous branches of the intercostal nerves.

The perforating arteries constitute part of the blood supply to the pectoralis major and the overlying tissue and skin. The second, third and fourth perforating branches give off medial mammary branches, which become enlarged during lactation.
