= Hugh Pemberton (physician) =

English doctor

Hugh Spear Pemberton (3 June 1890 – 15 January 1956) was an English physician remembered for describing Pemberton's sign.

== Biography ==
Hugh Pemberton qualified MB ChB from the University of Liverpool in 1913 and started working at the David Lewis Northern Hospital in Liverpool.

During World War I he served in the Royal Army Medical Corps, returning to the Northern Hospital after the war. He became a Member of the Royal College of Physicians in 1921 and was appointed consultant in 1924. He was also a lecturer in clinical medicine at the University of Liverpool. He became a Fellow of the Royal College of Physicians in 1941. He founded the diabetic clinic at the Northern Hospital in 1922, and published articles on diabetes, thyrotoxicosis and peripheral vascular disease, including the description of his eponymous sign in 1946.

Between 1947 and 1950, he served as chairman of the British Medical Association’s Birkenhead and Wirral division, and in 1950, he held the role of vice-president for the Association’s medicine section at its annual meeting.

He retired in 1955, and died suddenly at home in Cheshire in 1956.

== Publications ==
- Grainger A, Gregson DA, Pemberton HS. Thiouracil in the Treatment of Thyrotoxicosis. British Medical Journal. 1945 Sep 15; 2(4419):343–345.
- Pemberton HS. Sign of submerged goitre. The Lancet. 1946; 248(6423):509.
- Pemberton HS, Hunter WR. Intestinal actinomycosis treated with streptomycin. The Lancet. 1949 Jun 25; 1(6565):1094.
- Hotston RD, Pemberton HS. Stevens-Johnson syndrome. The Lancet. 1947 Apr 12; 1(6450):499.
- Fox JG, McCinnell RB, Pemberton HS, Watson DC. Method of preventing insulin atrophy. British Medical Journal. 1953 Nov 28; 2(4847):1202–1203.
- Pemberton HS. The clinical aspects of obesity. Practitioner. 1955 Jul; 175(1045):5–11.
- Evans RW, Littler TR, Pemberton HS. Glycogen storage in the liver in diabetes mellitus. Journal of Clinical Pathology. 1955 May; 8(2):110–113. doi:10.1136/jcp.8.2.110
