= Azygos lobe =

Normal anatomical variation of the upper lobe of the right lung

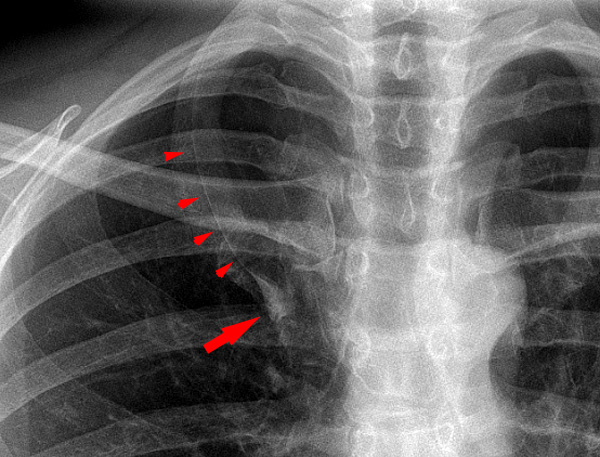
Azygos lobe on chest X-ray. Arrowheads show the delineation of the lobe. Arrow points to the azygos vein.

In human anatomy, an azygos lobe is a normal anatomical variation of the upper lobe of the right lung. It is seen in 0.3% of the population. Embryologically, it arises from an anomalous lateral course of the azygos vein, in a pleural septum within the apical segment of the right upper lobe or in other words an azygos lobe is formed when the right posterior cardinal vein, one of the precursors of the azygos vein, fails to migrate over the apex of the lung and penetrates it instead, carrying along two pleural layers as the azygous fissure, that invaginates into the upper portion of the right upper lobe.

== Clinical significance ==
An azygos lobe is usually an incidental finding on chest x-ray or CT scan. It is asymptomatic and not associated with any morbidity. However, it can cause technical problems in thoracoscopic procedures. The presence of the azygos lobe could alter the normal location of the superior vena cava or may be associated with other anomalies, including esophageal atresia or intrapulmonary right brachiocephalic veins.

== Additional images ==
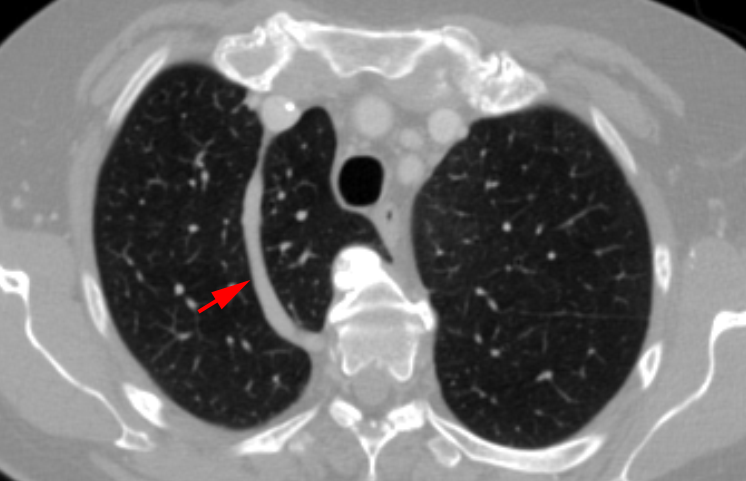
Azygos lobe in axial computertomography. Arrow on azygos vein.

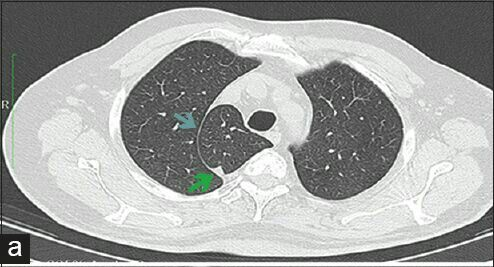
HRCT thorax, axial section delineates a well-defined, convex-shaped fold (Blue arrow), the azygos fissure. A tear-drop shaped density noted at the bottom of the fold (Green arrow) is the azygos vein.
