= Superior vena cava syndrome =

Group of symptoms caused by obstruction of the superior vena cava

Superior vena cava syndrome (Mediastinal syndrome)
- Other names: SVC obstruction
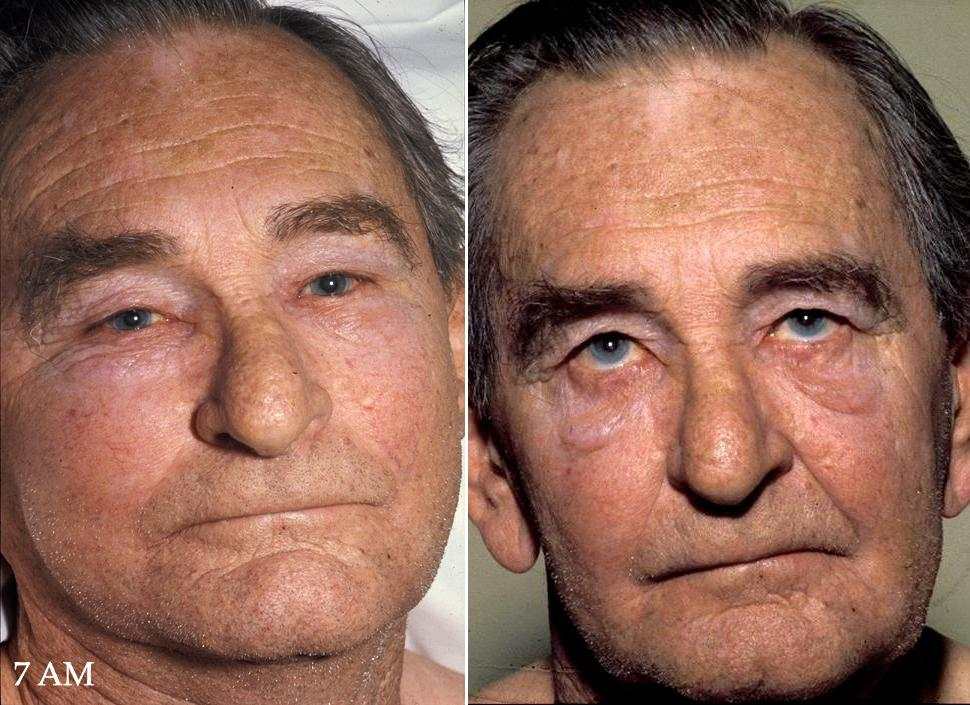
- Superior vena cava syndrome in a person with bronchogenic carcinoma. Note the swelling of his face first thing in the morning (left) and its resolution after being upright all day (right).
- Specialty: Pulmonology

Superior vena cava syndrome (SVCS) is a group of symptoms caused by obstruction of the superior vena cava ("SVC"), a short, wide vessel carrying circulating blood into the heart. The majority of cases are caused by malignant tumors within the mediastinum, most commonly lung cancer and non-Hodgkin's lymphoma, directly compressing or invading the SVC wall. Non-malignant causes are increasing in prevalence due to expanding use of intravascular devices (such as permanent central venous catheters and leads for pacemakers and defibrillators), which can result in thrombosis. Other non-malignant causes include benign mediastinal tumors, aortic aneurysm, infections, and fibrosing mediastinitis.

Characteristic features are edema (swelling due to excess fluid) of the face and arms and development of swollen collateral veins on the front of the chest wall. Shortness of breath and coughing are quite common symptoms; difficulty swallowing is reported in 11% of cases, headache in 6% and stridor (a high-pitched wheeze) in 4%. The symptoms are rarely life-threatening, though edema of the epiglottis can make breathing difficult, edema of the brain can cause reduced alertness, and in less than 5% of cases of SVCO, severe neurological symptoms or airway compromise are reported. Resolution of superior vena cava syndrome is directly related to the treatment of the underlying compression.

== Signs and symptoms ==
Shortness of breath is the most common symptom, followed by face or arm swelling.

Following are frequent symptoms:

- Difficulty breathing
- Headache
- Facial swelling
- Venous distention in the neck and distended veins in the upper chest and arms
- Migraines (especially if unusual to normal)
- Large decrease in lung capacity
- Facial swelling after bending/laying down
- Upper limb edema
- Lightheadedness
- Cough
- Edema (swelling) of the neck, called the collar of Stokes
- Pemberton's sign

Superior vena cava syndrome usually presents more gradually with an increase in symptoms over time as malignancies increase in size or invasiveness.

== Cause ==
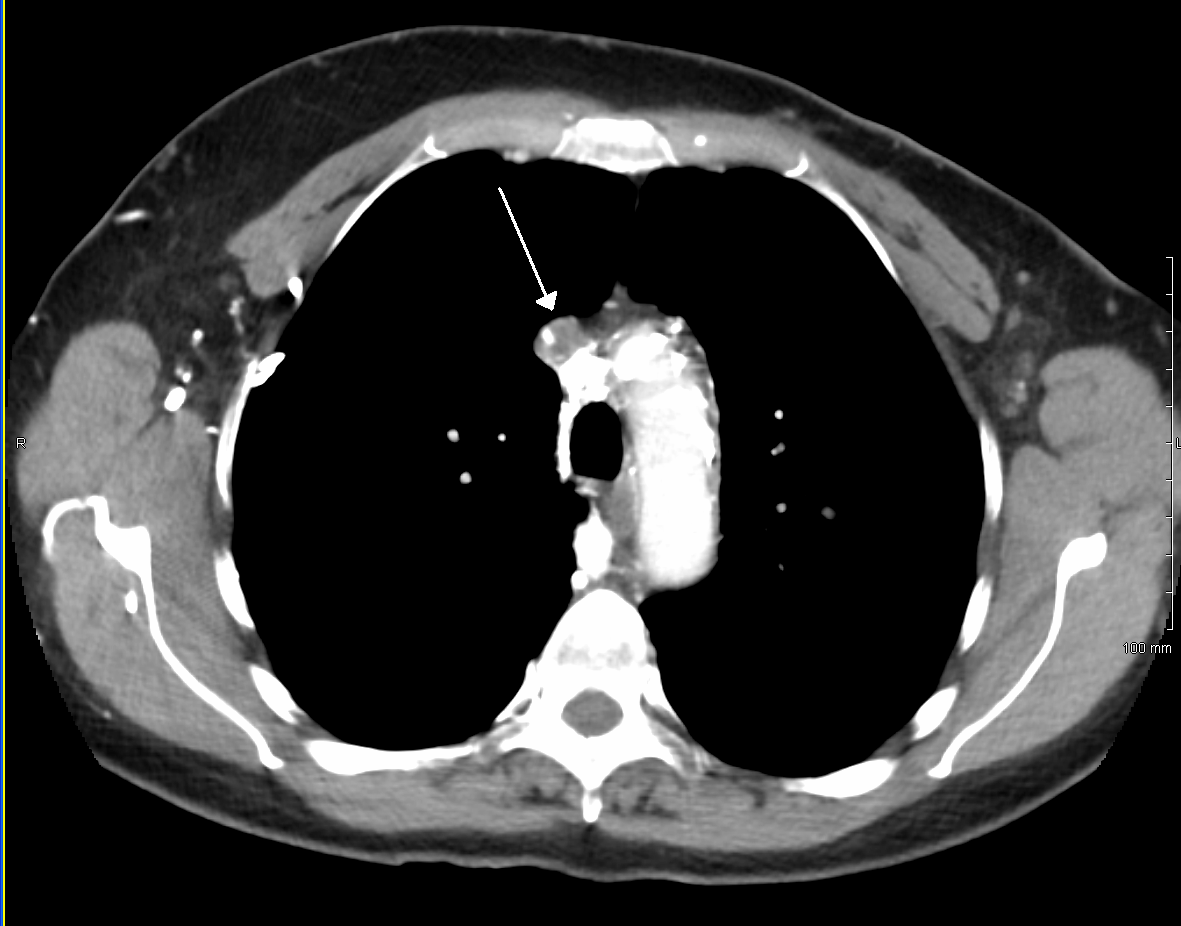
Thrombosis of the superior vena cava caused by an indwelling central venous catheter which caused superior vena cava syndrome

Over 80% of cases are caused by malignant tumors compressing the superior vena cava. Lung cancer, most commonly squamous cell carcinoma, comprises 75–80% of these cases and non-Hodgkin lymphoma, most commonly diffuse large B-cell lymphoma, comprises 10–15%. Rare malignant causes include Hodgkin's lymphoma, metastatic cancers, leukemia, leiomyosarcoma of the mediastinal vessels, and plasmocytoma. Syphilis and tuberculosis have also been known to cause superior vena cava syndrome. SVCS can be caused by invasion or compression by a pathological process or by a deep vein thrombosis in the vein itself, although this latter is less common (approximately 35% due to the use of intravascular devices).

== Diagnosis ==
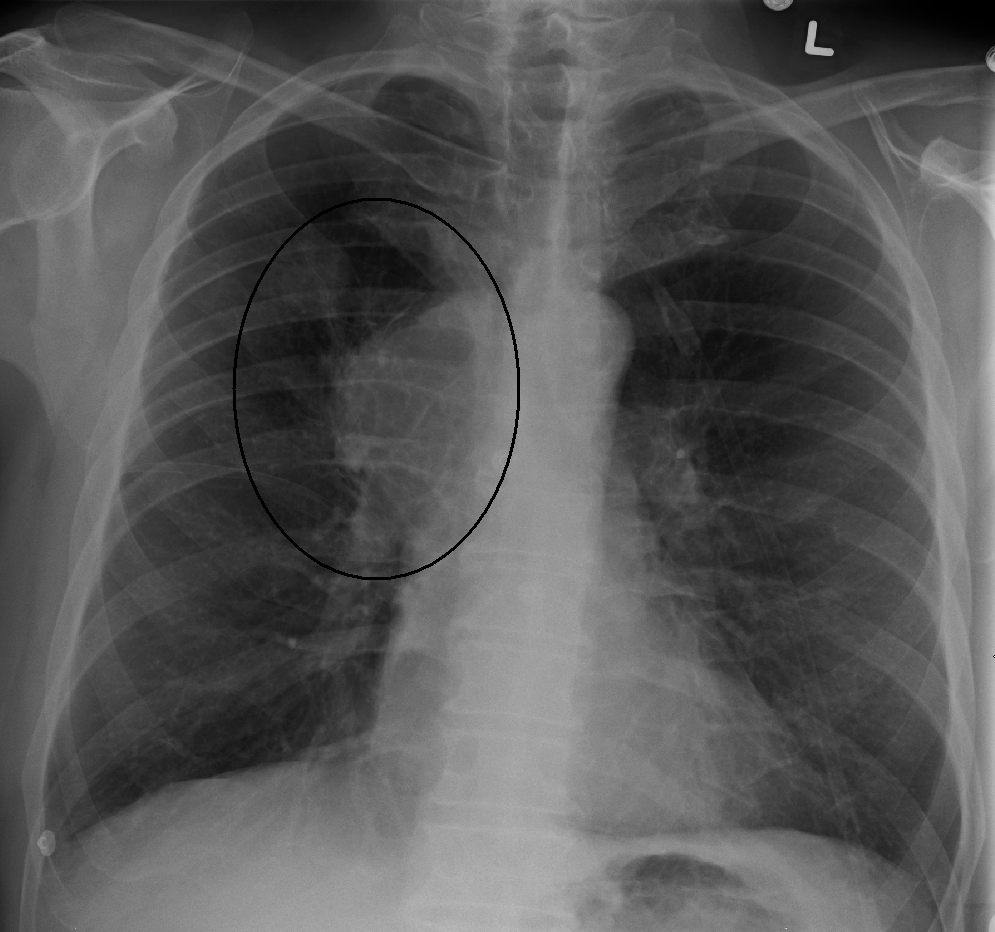
A CXR of a person with lung cancer, which was causing superior vena cava syndrome

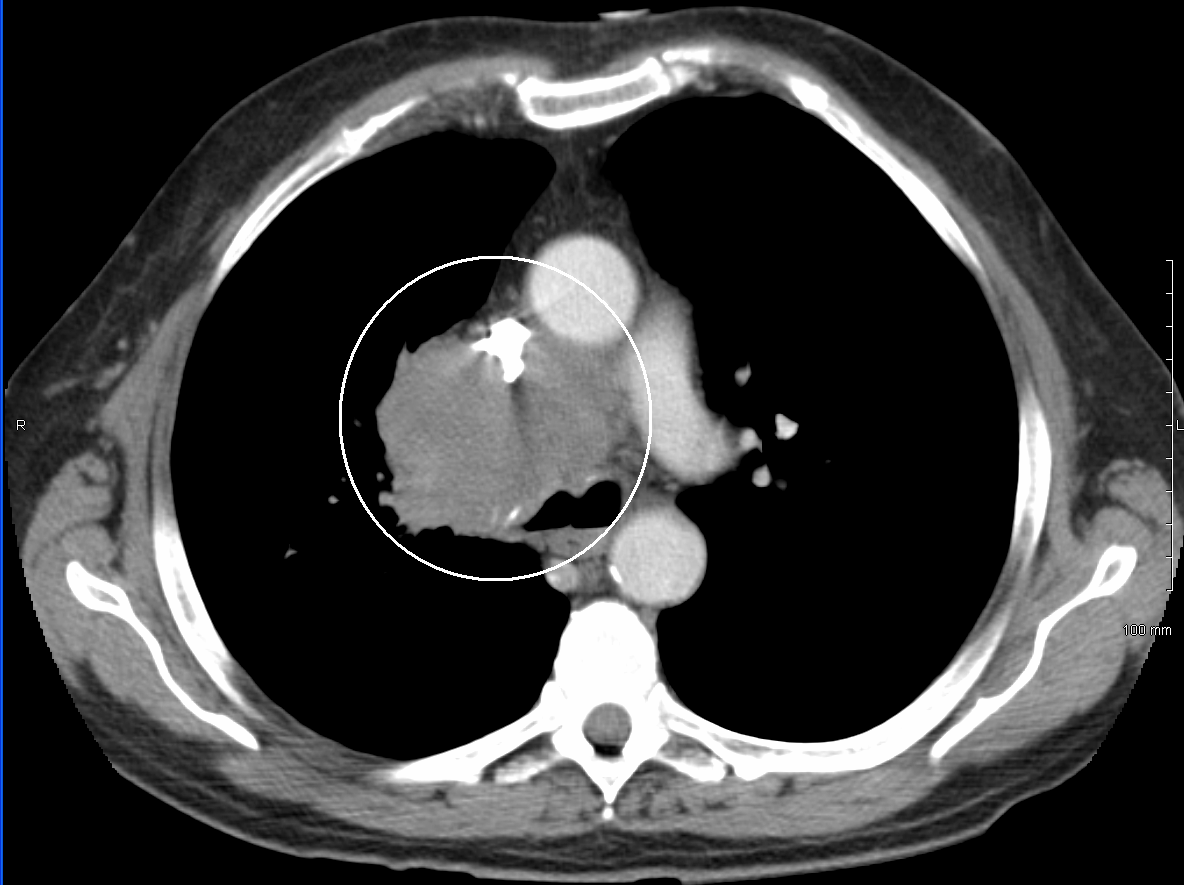
A CT image showing compression of the right hilar structures by cancer

The main techniques of diagnosing SVCS are with chest X-rays (CXR), CT scans, transbronchial needle aspiration at bronchoscopy and mediastinoscopy. CXRs often provide the ability to show mediastinal widening and may show the presenting primary cause of SVCS. However, 16% of people with SVC syndrome have a normal chest X-ray. CT scans should be contrast enhanced and be taken on the neck, chest, lower abdomen, and pelvis. They may also show the underlying cause and the extent to which the disease has progressed.

== Treatment ==
Several methods of treatment are available, mainly consisting of careful drug therapy and surgery. Glucocorticoids (such as prednisone or methylprednisolone) decrease the inflammatory response to tumor invasion and edema surrounding the tumor. Glucocorticoids are most helpful if the tumor is steroid-responsive, such as lymphomas. In addition, diuretics (such as furosemide) are used to reduce venous return to the heart which relieves the increased pressure.

In urgent cases, endovascular stenting is performed under conscious sedation, during which a metal expander is inserted to reopen the constricted superior vena cava by pushing the compressing tumor or thrombus aside and restoring blood flow; this typically brings patients rapid symptom relief within 24–72 hours, with clinical success rates exceeding 90%.

Should a patient require assistance with respiration whether it be by bag/valve/mask, bilevel positive airway pressure (BiPAP), continuous positive airway pressure (CPAP) or mechanical ventilation, extreme care should be taken. Increased airway pressure will tend to further compress an already compromised SVC and reduce venous return and in turn cardiac output and cerebral and coronary blood flow. Spontaneous respiration should be allowed during endotracheal intubation until sedation allows placement of an ET tube and reduced airway pressures should be employed when possible.

== Prognosis ==
Symptoms are usually relieved with radiation therapy within one month of treatment. However, even with treatment, 99% of patients die within two and a half years. This relates to the cancerous causes of SVC found in 90% of cases. The average age of disease onset is 54 years.

== See also ==
- Pemberton's sign
