= Anterior intercostal veins =

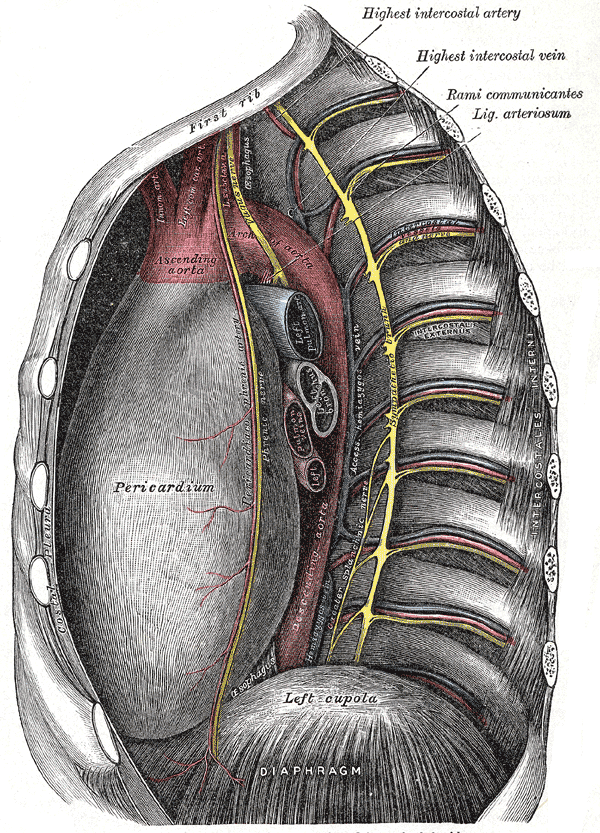
- Intercostal spaces, viewed from the left. (Anterior intercostal veins not labeled, but region is visible.)

Details
- Drains to: Internal thoracic vein
- Artery: Anterior intercostal arteries

Identifiers
- Latin: venae intercostales anteriores
- TA98: A12.3.04.022
- TA2: 4790
- FMA: 70839

The anterior intercostal veins are the veins which drain the anterior intercostal space.
