= Thymic veins =

Details
- Drains to: Left brachiocephalic vein
- Artery: Thymic arteries

Identifiers
- Latin: venae thymicae
- TA98: A12.3.04.005
- TA2: 4773
- FMA: 70828

Thymic veins are veins which drain the thymus. They are tributaries of the left brachiocephalic vein.
