= Oblique vein of the left atrium =

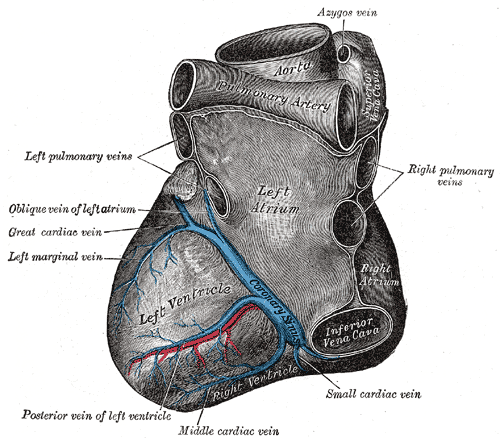
- Base and diaphragmatic surface of heart. (Oblique vein of the left atrium labeled at center left.)

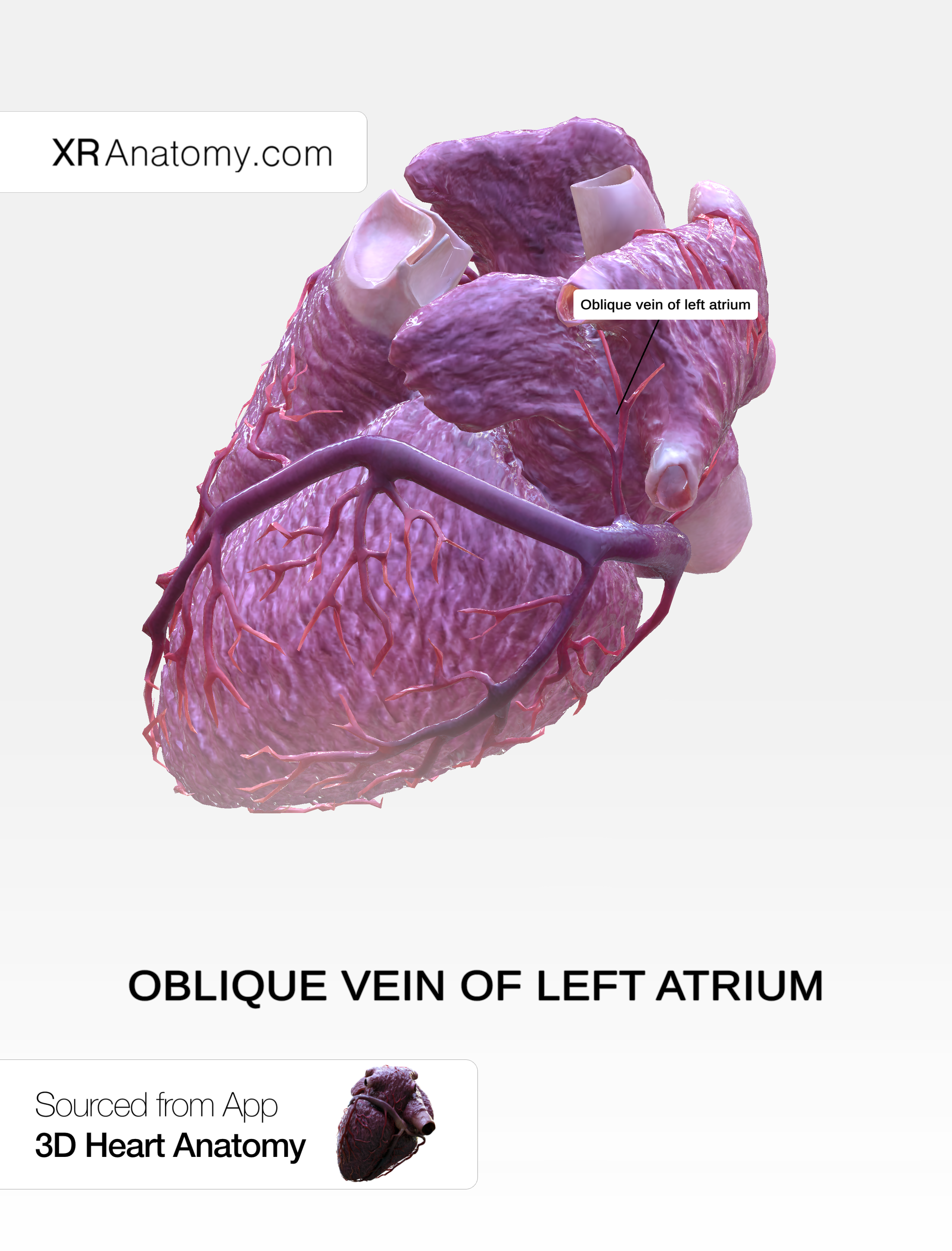

Details
- Drains from: Left atrium
- Drains to: Coronary sinus

Identifiers
- Latin: vena obliqua atrii sinistri
- TA98: A12.3.01.007
- TA2: 4163
- FMA: 4715

The oblique vein of the left atrium (oblique vein of Marshall) is a small vein which descends obliquely on the back of the left atrium and ends in the coronary sinus near its left extremity; it is continuous above with the ligament of the left vena cava (vestigial fold of Marshall), and the two structures form the remnant of the left Cuvierian duct. This obscure region of cardiac perfusion adjacent to the SA node rocks back and forth under systole and diastole thus further influencing cardiac autonomic innervation. Ablation of this channel seems reasonable to many observers.

== Additional images ==
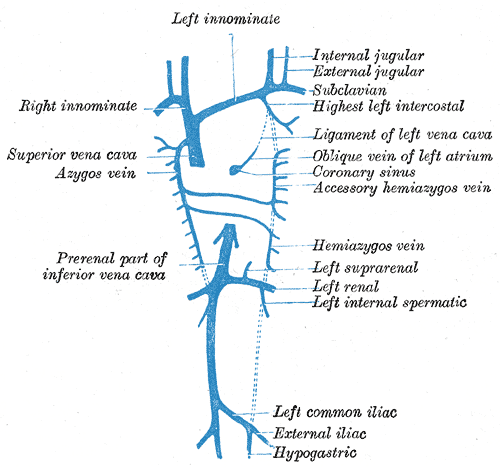
Diagram showing completion of development of the parietal veins.
