= Internal thoracic vein =

Large blood vessel draining breasts and the chest wall

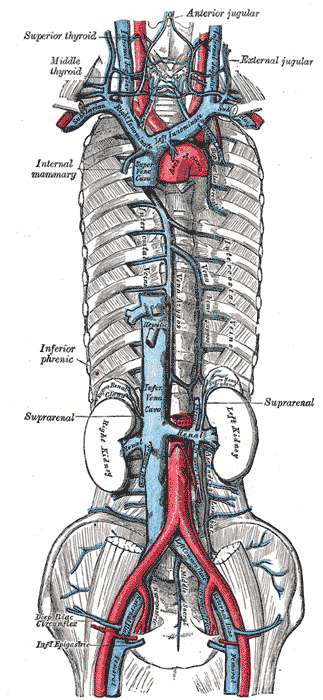
- Veins of the thorax and abdomen. The internal thoracic veins drain into the brachiocephalic veins.]

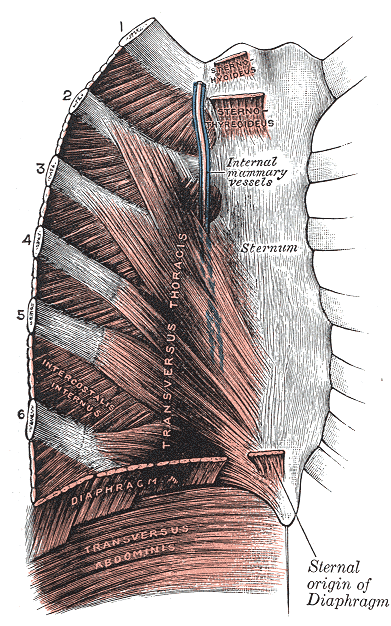
- Posterior surface of sternum and costal cartilages, showing Transversus thoracis. (Internal mammary vessels labeled at center top.)

Details
- Drains from: Superior epigastric vein
- Drains to: Brachiocephalic vein
- Artery: Internal thoracic artery

Identifiers
- Latin: vena thoracica interna
- TA98: A12.3.04.018
- TA2: 4786
- FMA: 4729

In human anatomy, the internal thoracic vein (previously known as the internal mammary vein) is the vein that drains the chest wall and breasts.

== Structure ==
Bilaterally, the internal thoracic vein arises from the superior epigastric vein, and accompanies the internal thoracic artery along its course. It drains the intercostal veins, although the posterior drainage is often handled by the azygous veins. It terminates in the brachiocephalic vein. It has a width of 2-3 mm.

There is either one or two internal thoracic veins accompanying the corresponding artery (internal thoracic artery). If internal thoracic vein is single, it usually runs medial to the artery. If there are double thoracic veins, they run on either side of the internal thoracic artery.

=== Variations ===
Bifurcation of each internal thoracic vein is common. The left internal thoracic vein may bifurcate between ribs 3-4 or remain as a single vein. The right internal thoracic vein may bifurcate between ribs 2-4 or remain as a single vein.

== Function ==
The internal thoracic vein drains the chest wall and the breasts.

== Clinical significance ==
Knowledge on the course of internal thoracic vein and artery is important during interventional procedures through the anterior chest wall such as biopsy and empyema drainage. This is to avoid puncturing the vessels and cause massive bleeding.

Accidental placement of central venous catheter in the internal thoracic vein can cause pleural effusions, chest wall abscess, pulmonary edema, shortness of breath and chest pain.

== Other animals ==
Internal thoracic vein runs just lateral to the sternum.

The internal thoracic vein can act as a collateral circulation for blood from the inferior vena cava to the superior vena cava. This can work in either direction. It may partially compensate for disturbances to blood flow.

== Additional images ==
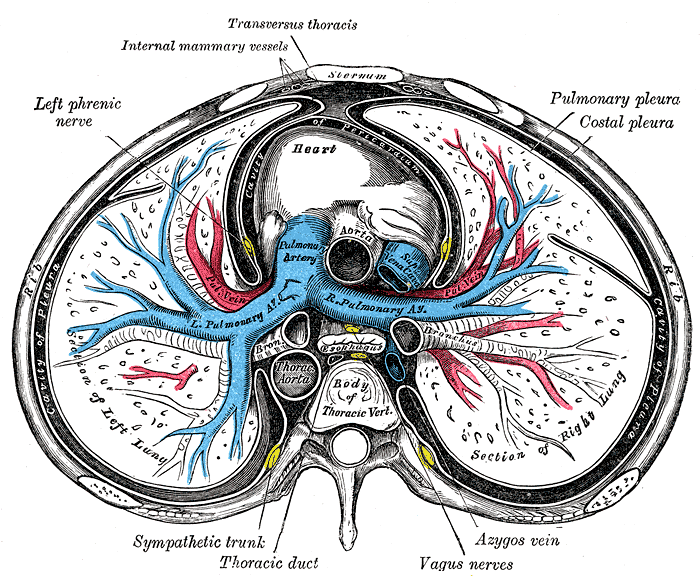
Transverse section of thorax, showing relations of pulmonary artery.
