= Supreme intercostal vein =

Vein

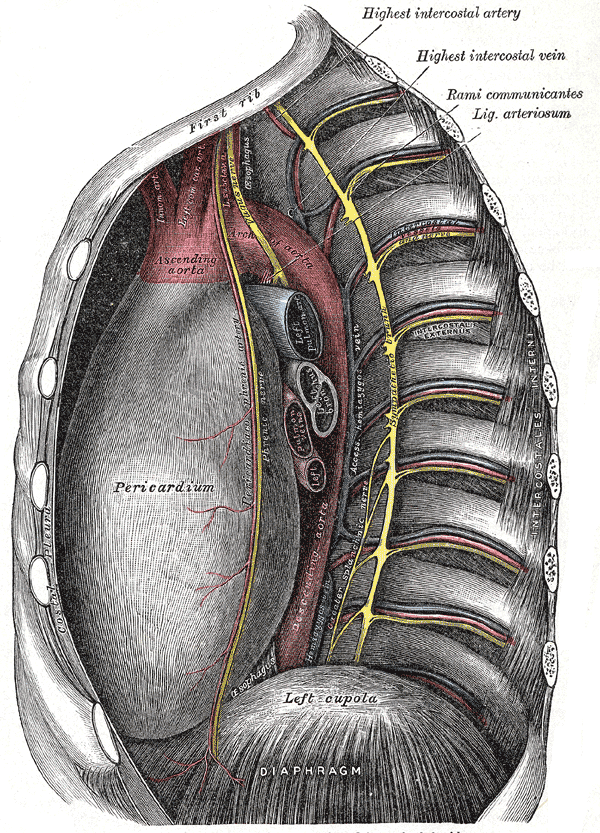
- Intercostal spaces, viewed from the left. (Highest intercostal vein labeled at upper right.)

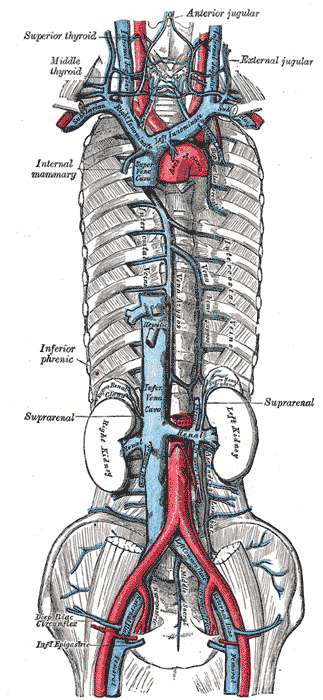
- The venæ cavæ and azygos veins, with their tributaries. (Highest intercostal labeled, very faintly, written vertically, to the right of the aortic arch.)

Details
- Drains to: Brachiocephalic vein
- Artery: Intercostal arteries

Identifiers
- Latin: vena intercostalis suprema
- TA98: A12.3.04.023
- TA2: 4791
- FMA: 4744

The supreme intercostal vein (highest intercostal vein) is a paired vein that drains the first intercostal space on its corresponding side.

It usually drains into the brachiocephalic vein. Alternatively, it drains into the superior intercostal vein, or the vertebral vein of its corresponding side.

== Clinical significance ==
This vein does not have valves, this is an important point when it comes to spread of cancerous secondaries.

== Additional images ==
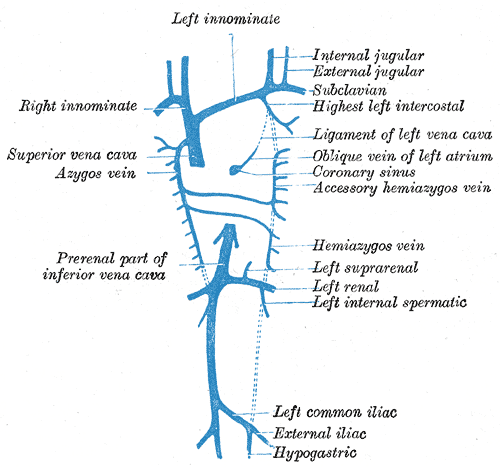
Diagram showing completion of development of the parietal veins.

== See also ==
- superior intercostal vein
- posterior intercostal vein
- azygos vein
