= Iliac circumflex =

Iliac circumflex or Circumflex iliac can refer to:

- Superficial circumflex iliac artery
- Superficial iliac circumflex vein
- Deep circumflex iliac artery
- Deep circumflex iliac vein
