= Pemberton's sign =

- Differential diagnosis: superior vena cava syndrome

The Pemberton's sign is a physical examination tool used to demonstrate the presence of latent pressure in the thoracic inlet. The sign is named after Hugh Pemberton, who characterized it in 1946.

The Pemberton maneuver is achieved by having the patient elevate both arms (usually 180 degrees anterior flexion at the shoulder) until the forearms touch the sides of the face. A positive Pemberton's sign is marked by the presence of facial congestion and cyanosis, as well as respiratory distress after approximately one minute.

== Causes ==
A positive Pemberton's sign is indicative of superior vena cava syndrome (SVC), commonly the result of a mass in the mediastinum. Although the sign is most commonly described in patients with substernal goiters where the goiter "corks off" the thoracic inlet, the maneuver is potentially useful in any patient with adenopathy, tumor, or fibrosis involving the mediastinum. SVC syndrome has been observed as a result of diffuse mediastinal lymphadenopathy of various pathologies such as cystic fibrosis and Castleman’s disease. Park et al. reported enlarged cervical lymph nodes associated with hemophagocytic lymphohistiocytosis as the cause of internal jugular vein compression, which presented clinically similar to SVC syndrome.
