= Azygos vein =

Human blood vessel by the spine

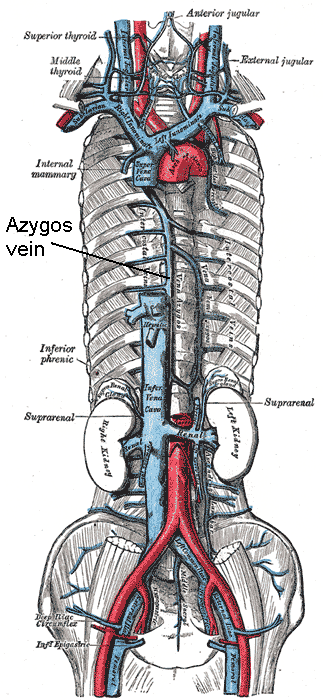
- Superior vena cava, inferior vena cava, azygos vein and their tributaries. (Vena azygos labeled at center.)

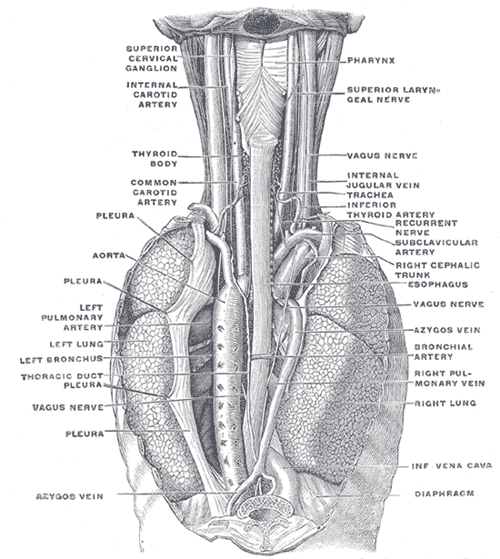
- Posterior view: The position and relation of the esophagus in the cervical region and in the posterior mediastinum. Seen from behind. (Azygos vein labeled at bottom left.)

Details
- Precursor: Right supracardinal vein
- Drains from: Superior intercostal vein
- Drains to: Superior vena cava

Identifiers
- Latin: vena azygos
- MeSH: D001401
- TA98: A12.3.07.001
- TA2: 4747
- FMA: 4838

The azygos vein (from Ancient Greek ἄζυγος (ázugos), meaning 'unwedded' or 'unpaired') is a vein running up the right side of the thoracic vertebral column draining itself towards the superior vena cava. It connects the systems of superior vena cava and inferior vena cava and can provide an alternative path for blood to the right atrium when either of the venae cavae is blocked.

== Structure ==
The azygos vein transports deoxygenated blood from the posterior walls of the thorax and abdomen into the superior vena cava.

It is formed by the union of the ascending lumbar veins with the right subcostal veins at the level of the 12th thoracic vertebra, ascending to the right of the descending aorta and thoracic duct, passing behind the right crus of diaphragm, anterior to the vertebral bodies of T12 to T5 and right posterior intercostal arteries. At the level of T4 vertebrae, it arches over the root of the right lung from behind to the front to join the superior vena cava. The trachea and oesophagus is located medially to the arch of the azygous vein.

The "arch of the azygos vein" (arcus vena azygos) is an important anatomic landmark. As an anatomical variation in 1–2% of the population, the arch can be displaced laterally, thereby creating a pleural septum separating an azygos lobe from the upper lobe of the right lung.

The origin and anatomical course of the azygos vein are quite variable. Usually, there is a singular azygos vein on the right side of the body. However, the azygos vein is occasionally located in the midline or two independent veins may be present like in early embryonic development. In some rare variations, for example, it also drains thoracic veins, bronchial veins, and even gonadal veins. The vein is so named because it has no symmetrically equivalent vein on the left side of the body.

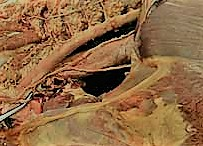
Structure and location of azygos vein

=== Development ===
It has been proposed that the azygos vein develops by originally draining to the posterior cardinal vein and then to the longitudinal venous channel. Following retrogression of the left common cardinal vein, the left azygos vein loses contact with the posterior cardinal vein. Thus, the blood drains into the right azygos line.

=== Tributaries ===
Major tributaries are the hemiazygos vein and accessory hemiazygos vein, draining into the azygous vein at the midthoracic level. These two veins are located at the opposite side of the vertebral column. The azygous vein also receives drainage from all the intercostal veins on the right, except for supreme intercostal vein (first intercostal vein). Other tributaries include the right bronchial veins and veins from pericardium, mediastinum, and oesophagus. It communicates with the vertebral venous plexuses.

== Function ==
The azygos system of veins is considered to be the azygos vein, along with its left-sided counterparts, the hemiazygos vein and the accessory hemiazygos vein. It also creates a cavo-caval anastomosis by offering an alternative, collateral blood flow from the lower half of the body to the superior vena cava, bypassing the inferior vena cava. This can have clinical significance in any blood flow restriction of the inferior vena cava.

== Clinical significance ==
Azygos vein abnormalities can be suggested on chest radiograph by enlargement of the azygos shadow to greater than 1cm. False positives can occur in heart failure causing increased pressures on the right side of the heart, or adjacent lymphadenopathy. Azygos and hemiazygos continuation of the inferior vena cava (IVC) was not common in daily life. It is very hard to observe, particularly when it is not associated with congenital heart disease or deep venous thrombosis. Thus, it is crucial to diagnose the enlarged azygos vein at the confluence with the superior vena cava and in the retrocrural space to prevent misdiagnosis as a right-sided paratracheal mass. The loss of the intrahepatic segment of IVC with azygous and hemiazygos continuation happens in 0.6% of patients diagnosed for congenital heart disease and usually occurs simultaneously with situs inversus, asplenia, or polysplenia, persistent left superior vena cava (SVC), and congenital pulmonary venolobar syndrome. Azygos and hemiazygos continuation of the IVC is rare especially when it is not associated with congenital heart disease.

== History ==
The Greek root zyg refers to a pair. 'A-' means not. Thus, azygos means unpaired. The azygos vein is unpaired in that there is only one in the body, mostly on the right side. While there is the hemiazygos vein and its accessory on the left side of the body, they are considered tributaries of the azygos vein rather than its left-side equivalent.

This terminology is only accurate in some species, such as the human, dog, and cat. Ruminants (such as sheep and cows) have paired azygos veins.

== Additional images ==
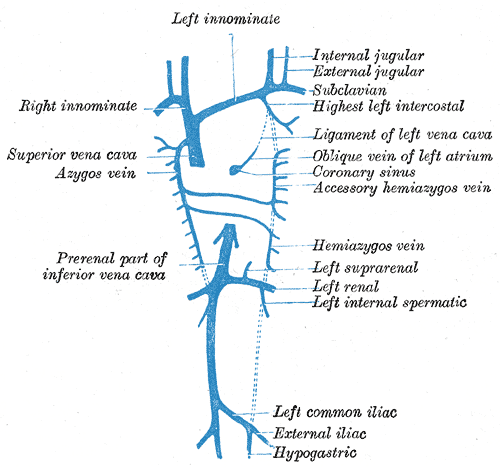
Diagram showing completion of development of the parietal veins.

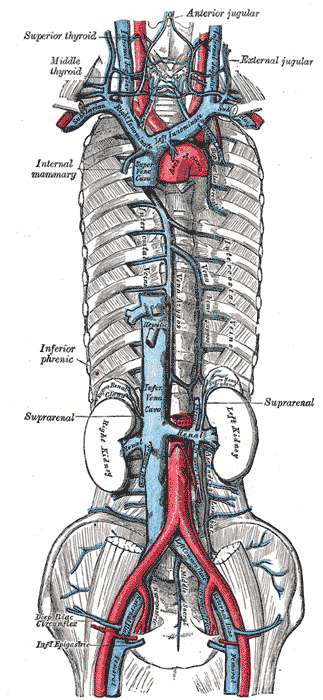
The venæ cavæ and azygos veins, with their tributaries.

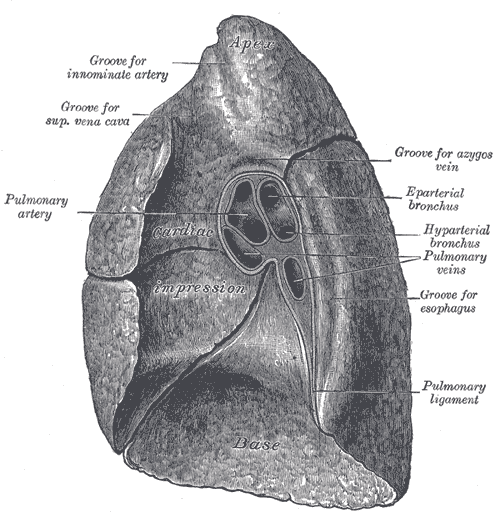
Mediastinal surface of right lung.

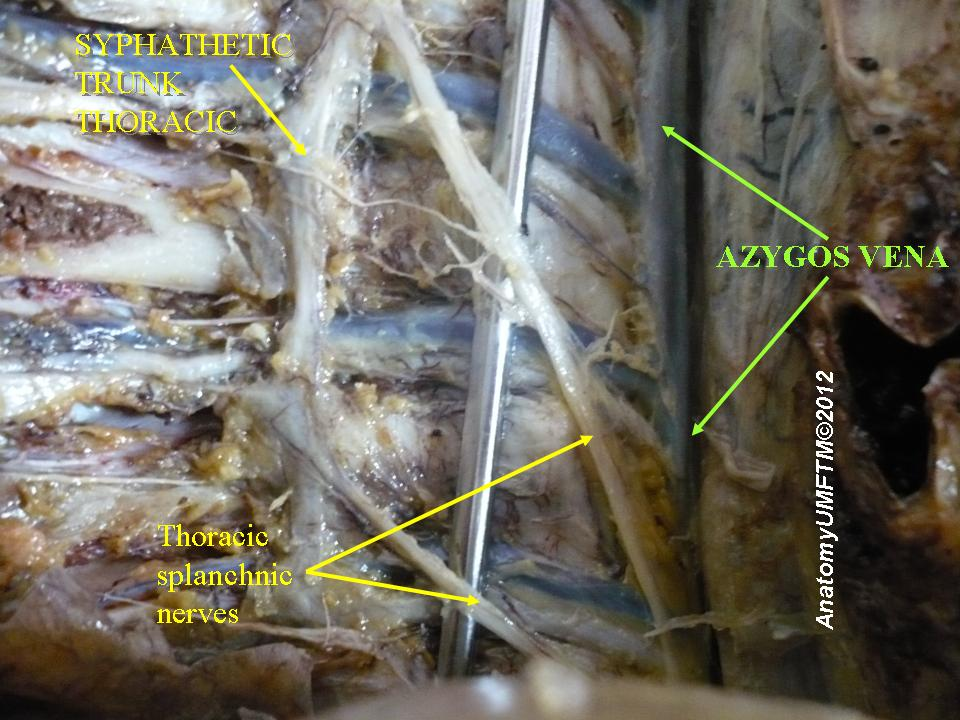
Azygos vein

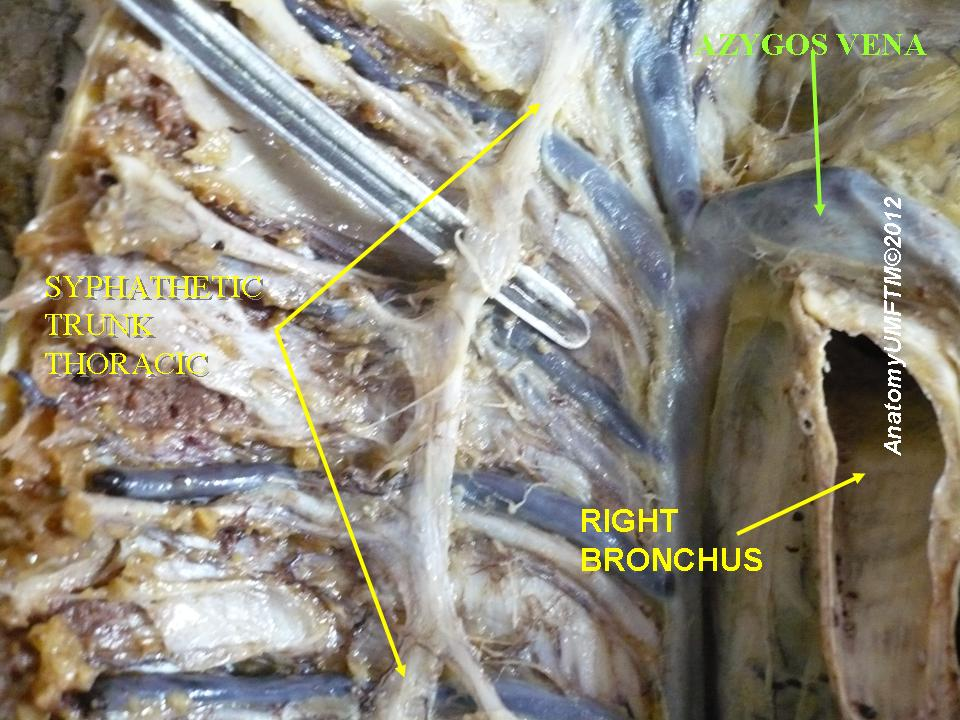
Azygos vein

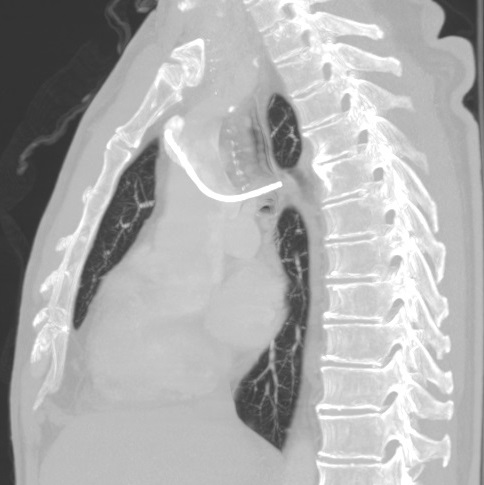
CT scan showing a port whose tip goes into the azygos vein.

== See also ==
- Hemiazygos vein
- Posterior intercostal veins
- Superior vena cava
- Chronic cerebrospinal venous insufficiency
- Azygos lobe
