= Persistent left superior vena cava =

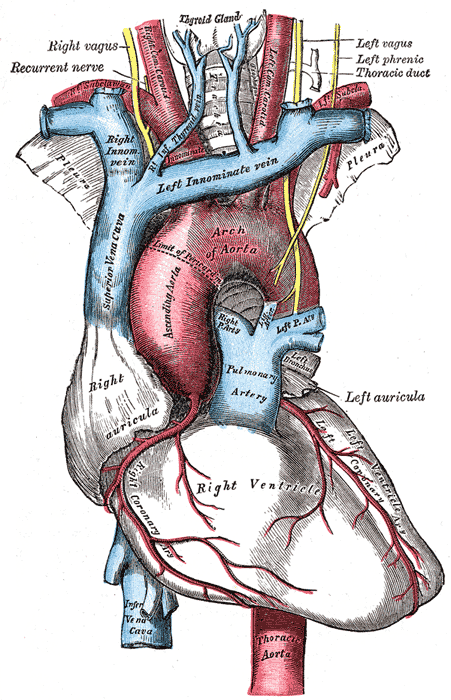
- The (right) superior vena cava (on left) and the left brachiocephalic vein (here labeled as left innominate vein). The left superior vena cava is not shown in this image.

In anatomy, a persistent left superior vena cava is the most common variation of the thoracic venous system. It is present in between 0.3% and 0.5% of the population, and is an embryologic remnant that results from a failure to involute.

== Presentation ==
In persistent left superior vena cava, the left brachiocephalic vein does not develop fully and the left upper limb and head and neck drain into the right atrium via the coronary sinus.

In isolation, the variation is considered benign, but is very frequently associated with cardiac abnormalities (e.g. ventricular septal defect, atrioventricular septal defect) that have a significant mortality and morbidity. It is more frequent in patients with congenital heart defects.

The (right) superior vena cava is almost always unaffected by the presence of persistent left superior vena cava.

== Diagnosis ==
If an anomaly is detected during a routine ultrasound, a fetal echocardiogram is performed to determine whether a fetus has the condition. Otherwise, it is often unnoticed unless an extenuating circumstance warrants further examination of the heart, usually much later in life.

CT and MRI scans in a parasagittal section may show a "pipe" sign where the left superior vena cava occurs.

== Treatment ==
If no other cardiac abnormalities are present, persistent left superior vena cava will not be treated, as it is usually asymptomatic and unharmful. If it drains into the left atrium, then deoxygenated blood enters the circulation to the body, and cyanosis may occur.
