= Superior intercostal vein =

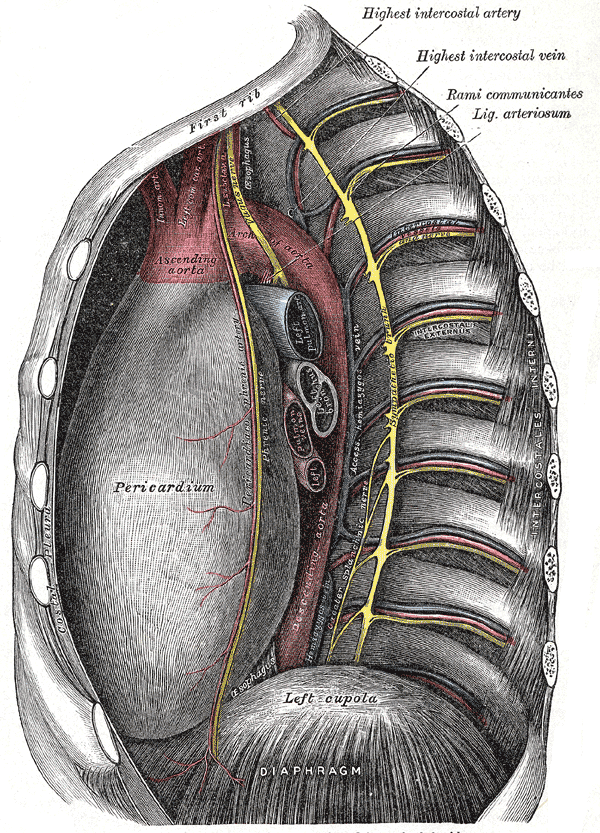
- Intercostal spaces, viewed from the left

Details
- Source: Posterior intercostal veins #2, #3, and #4
- Drains to: Azygos vein, brachiocephalic vein
- Artery: Intercostal arteries

Identifiers
- Latin: vena intercostalis superior dextra, vena intercostalis superior sinistra

The superior intercostal veins are two veins that drain the 2nd, 3rd, and 4th intercostal spaces, one vein for each side of the body.

== Right superior intercostal vein ==
The right superior intercostal vein drains the 2nd, 3rd, and 4th posterior intercostal veins on the right side of the body. It flows into the azygos vein.

== Left superior intercostal vein ==
The left superior intercostal vein drains the 2nd and 3rd posterior intercostal veins on the left side of the body. It usually drains into the left brachiocephalic vein. It may also communicate with the accessory hemiazygos vein.

As it passes posteriorly above the aortic arch, it crosses deep to the phrenic nerve and the pericardiacophrenic vessels and then superficial to the vagus nerve.

== See also ==
- Supreme intercostal vein
- Posterior intercostal veins
