= Intercostal arteries =

Arteries supplying the space between the ribs

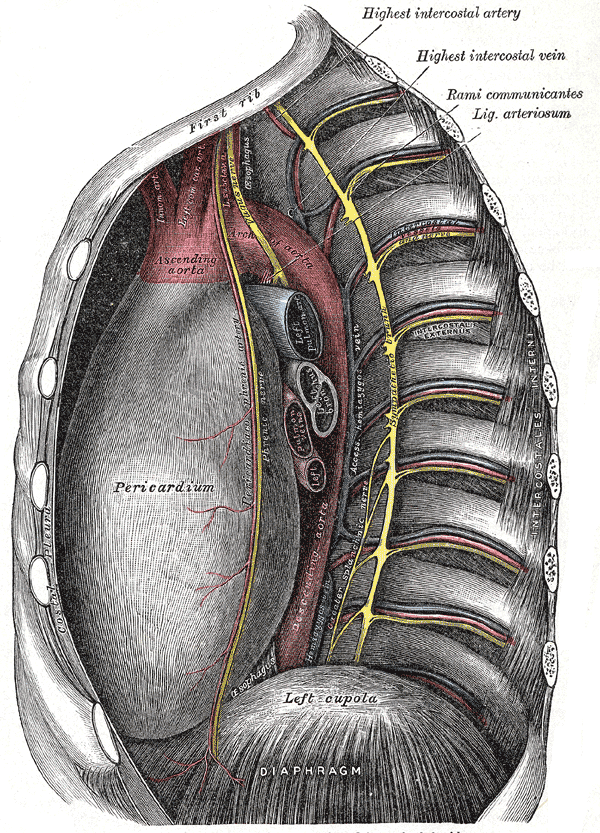
- Intercostal spaces, viewed from the left

Details
- Vein: Intercostal veins
- Supplies: Intercostal muscles and intercostal space

Identifiers
- Latin: arteriae intercostales

The intercostal arteries are a group of arteries passing within an intercostal space (the space between two adjacent ribs). There are 9 anterior and 11 posterior intercostal arteries on each side of the body. The anterior intercostal arteries are branches of the internal thoracic artery and its terminal branch – the musculophrenic artery. The posterior intercostal arteries are branches of the supreme intercostal artery and thoracic aorta.

Each anterior intercostal artery anastomoses with the corresponding posterior intercostal artery arising from the thoracic aorta.

== Anterior intercostal arteries ==
=== Origin ===
The upper six anterior intercostal arteries are branches of the internal thoracic artery (anterior intercostal branches of internal thoracic artery). The internal thoracic artery then divides into its two terminal branches, one of which - the musculophrenic artery - proceeds to issue anterior intercostal arteries to the remaining 7th, 8th, and 9th intercostal spaces; these diminish in size as the spaces decrease in length.

=== Course and relations ===
They are at first situated between the pleurae and the intercostales interni, and then between the mm. intercostales interni et intimi.

=== Distribution ===
They supply the intercostal muscles and, by branches which perforate the intercostales externi, the pectoral muscles and the mamma.

== Posterior intercostal arteries ==
There are eleven posterior intercostal arteries on each side. Each artery divides into an anterior and a posterior ramus.

=== Origin ===
- The 1st and 2nd posterior intercostal arteries arise from the supreme intercostal artery, a branch of the costocervical trunk of the subclavian artery. The SICA descends vertically. It passes lateral to the cervicothoracic ganglion. It passes in between the pleural cupula, and anterior border of the neck of rib I. It then passes anterior to the necks of ribs II-III.
- The remaining nine arteries arise from (the posterior aspect of) the thoracic aorta.

=== Course and relations ===
Each posterior intercostal artery travels along the bottom of the rib alongside its corresponding posterior intercostal vein and intercostal nerve; the vein is superior to the artery, and the nerve is inferior to it. The mnemonic "VAN" is commonly used to recall their order from superior to inferior.

The right aortic intercostals are longer than the left because of the position of the aorta on the left side of the vertebral column; they pass across the bodies of the vertebrae behind the esophagus, thoracic duct, and azygos vein, and are covered by the right lung and pleura.

The left aortic intercostals run backward on the sides of the vertebrae and are covered by the left lung and pleura; the upper two vessels are crossed by the left superior intercostal vein, the lower vessels by the hemiazygos vein.

The sympathetic trunk (opposite the heads of the ribs) and splanchnic nerves pass anterior to the arteries.

== See also ==
- Supreme intercostal vein
- Superior intercostal vein
- Anterior intercostal veins
- Posterior intercostal veins
- Intercostal nerves
