= Lateral thoracic vein =

Large blood vessel

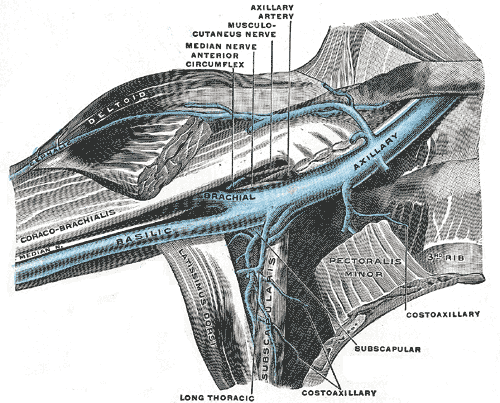
- The veins of the right axilla, viewed from in front. (Lateral thoracic vein not labeled but region is visible.)

Details
- Drains to: Axillary vein
- Artery: Lateral thoracic artery

Identifiers
- Latin: vena thoracica lateralis
- TA98: A12.3.08.011
- TA2: 4971
- FMA: 71210

The lateral thoracic vein (sometimes debatably referred to as the long thoracic vein) is a tributary of the axillary vein. It runs with the lateral thoracic artery and drains the serratus anterior muscle and the pectoralis major muscle.

Normally, the thoracoepigastric vein exists between this vein and superficial epigastric vein (a tributary of femoral vein), to act as a shunt for blood if the portal system (through the liver) develops hypertension or a blockage.
