= Superior vena cava =

One of two veinous trunks bringing deoxygenated blood back to the heart

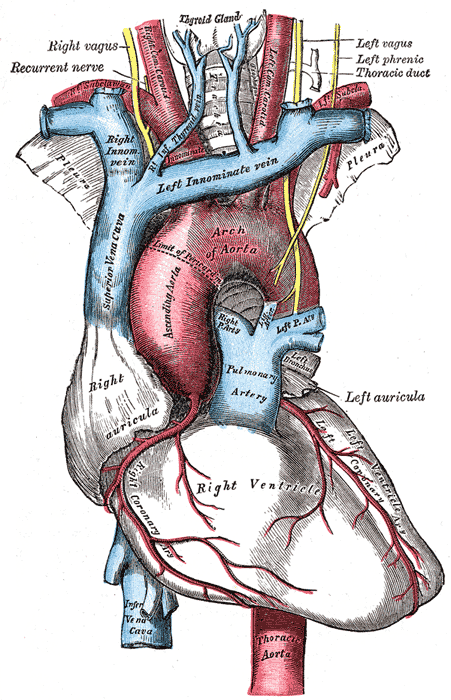
- The superior vena cava drains from the left and right brachiocephalic veins into the right atrium

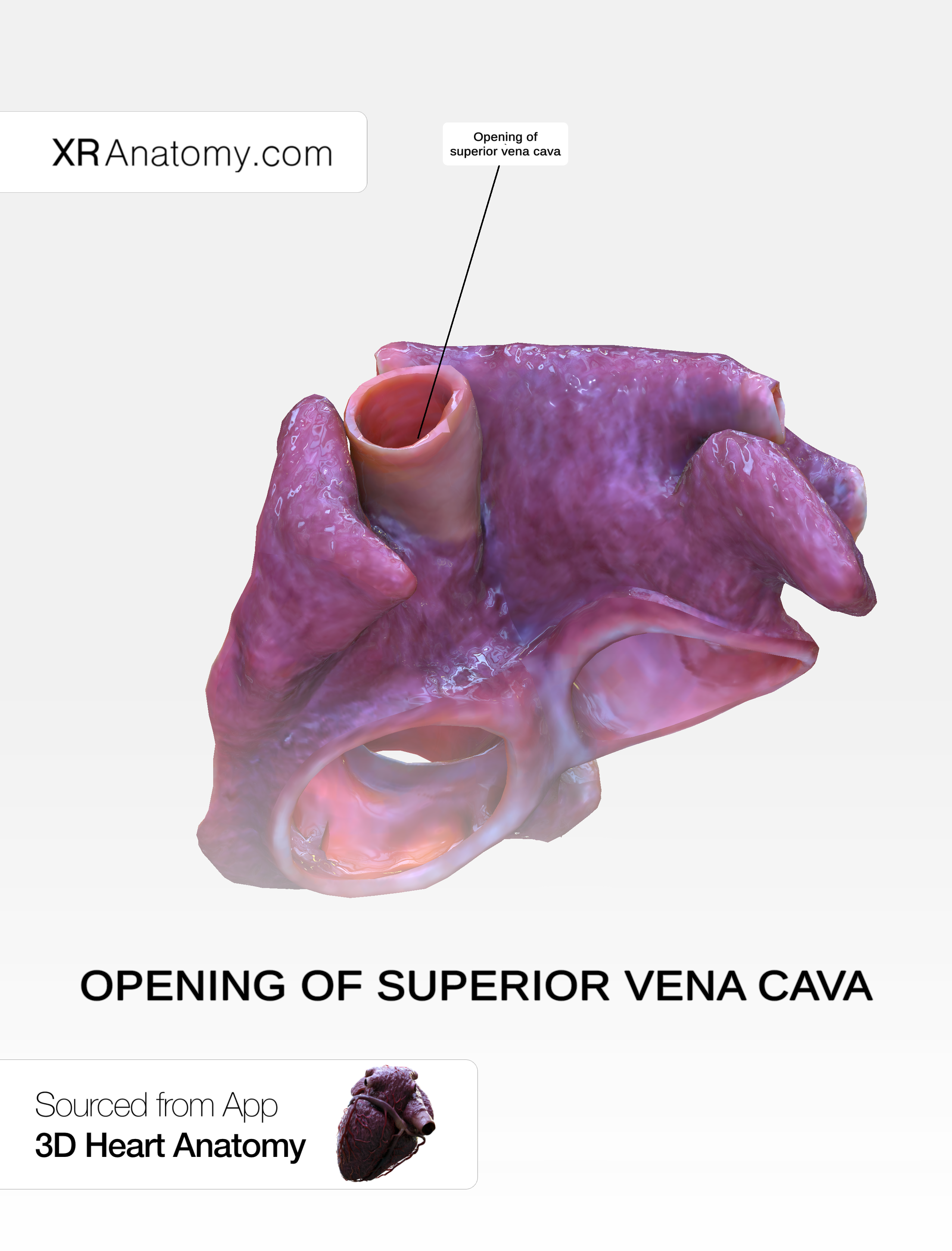

Details
- Precursor: Common cardinal veins
- Drains from: Left and right brachiocephalic veins
- Source: Brachiocephalic vein, azygos vein
- Drains to: Right atrium

Identifiers
- Latin: vena cava superior, vena maxima
- MeSH: D014683
- TA98: A12.3.03.001
- TA2: 4745
- FMA: 4720

The superior vena cava (SVC) is the superior of the two venae cavae, the great venous trunks that return deoxygenated blood from the systemic circulation to the right atrium of the heart. It is a large-diameter (24 mm) short length (~7 cm) vein that receives venous return from the upper half of the body, above the diaphragm. Venous return from the lower half, below the diaphragm, flows through the inferior vena cava. The SVC is located in the anterior right superior mediastinum. It is the typical site of central venous access via a central venous catheter or a peripherally inserted central catheter. Mentions of "the cava" without further specification usually refer to the SVC.

== Structure ==
The superior vena cava is formed by the left and right brachiocephalic veins, which receive blood from the upper limbs, head and neck, behind the lower border of the first right costal cartilage. It passes vertically downwards behind the first intercostal space and receives the azygos vein just before it pierces the fibrous pericardium opposite the right second costal cartilage and its lower part is intrapericardial. It then terminates in the upper and posterior part of the sinus venarum of the right atrium, at the upper right front portion of the heart. It is also known as the cranial vena cava in other animals. No valve divides the superior vena cava from the right atrium.

The superior vena cava is made up of three layers, starting with the innermost endothelial tunica intima. The middle layer is the tunica media, composed of smooth muscle tissue, and the outermost and thickest layer is the tunica adventitia, composed of collagen and elastic connective tissue that allow for flexibility. The tunica adventitia contains three zones, with the middle zone consisting of few smooth muscle fibers; this differs from the longitudinal bundles of smooth muscle found in the same zone of the inferior vena cava.

=== Anatomical variation ===
The most common anatomical variation is a persistent left superior vena cava. In persons with a persistent left superior vena cava, the right superior vena cava may be normal, small or absent, with or without an anterior communicating vein. This variation is present in less than 0.5% of the general population, but in up to 10% in patients with congenital heart disease.

== Clinical significance ==
Superior vena cava obstruction refers to a partial or complete obstruction of the superior vena cava, typically in the context of cancer such as a cancer of the lung, metastatic cancer, or lymphoma. Obstruction can lead to enlarged veins in the head and neck, and may also cause breathlessness, cough, chest pain, and difficulty swallowing. Pemberton's sign may be positive. Tumours causing obstruction may be treated with chemotherapy and/or radiotherapy to reduce their effects, and corticosteroids may also be given.

In tricuspid valve regurgitation, these pulsations are very strong.

No valve divides the superior vena cava from the right atrium. As a result, the (right) atrial and (right) ventricular contractions are conducted up into the internal jugular vein and, through the sternocleidomastoid muscle, can be seen as the jugular venous pressure.

== Additional images ==
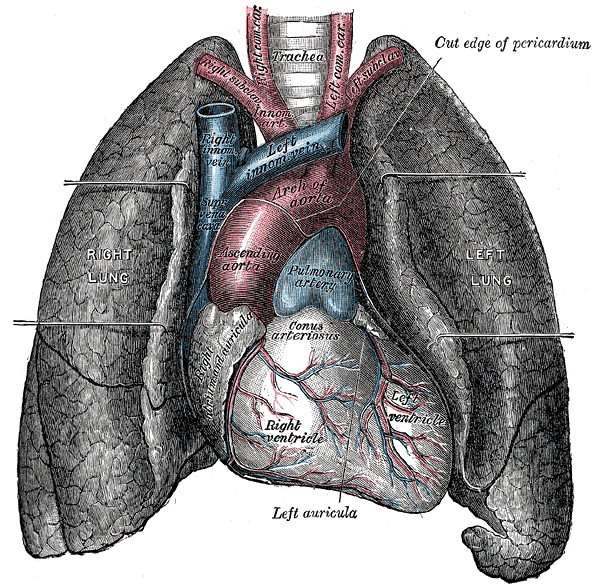
The thorax, viewed from the front, showing the superior vena cava between the heart and lungs.

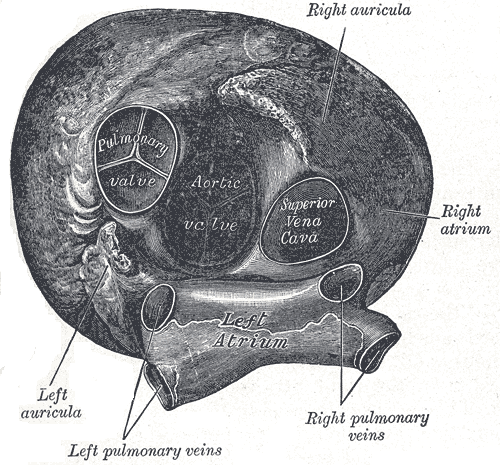
Heart seen from above, with the valve-less entry of the superior vena cava visible on the right.

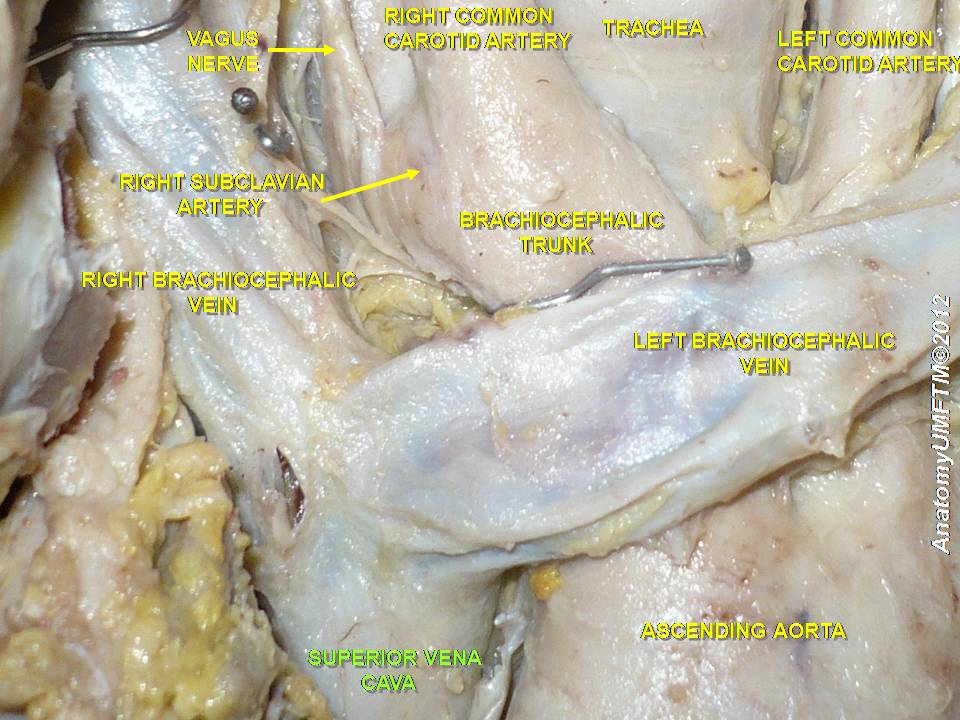
Superior vena cava in a cadaveric specimen.

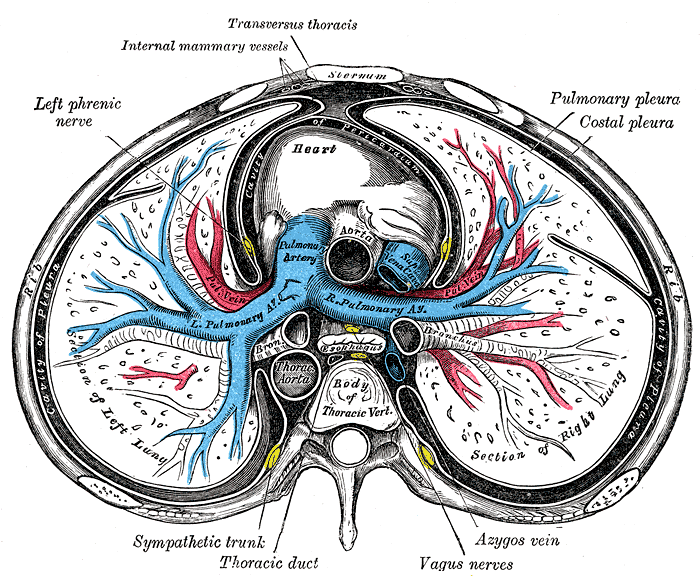
Cross-section of the thorax showing the formation of the superior vena cava.

== See also ==
- Persistent left superior vena cava
- Superior vena cava syndrome
- Inferior vena cava
