= Internal thoracic artery =

Artery of the thorax

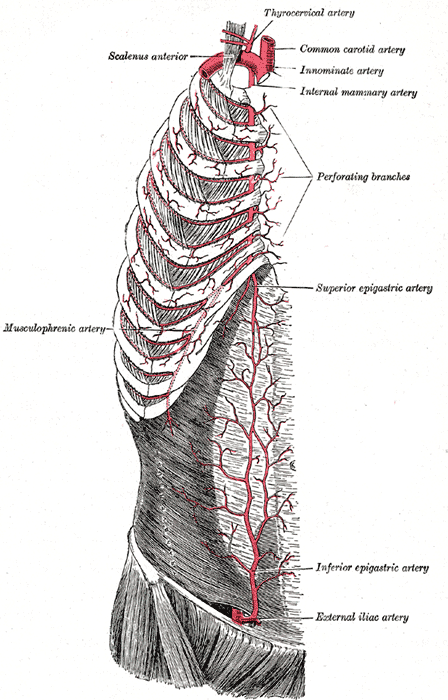
- Right internal thoracic artery and its branches (labeled under its old name the Internal mammary artery, at upper right).

Details
- Source: Subclavian artery
- Branches: Pericardiocophrenic; Anterior intercostal branches Musculophrenic; Superior epigastric Perforating branches
- Vein: Internal thoracic vein

Identifiers
- Latin: arteria thoracica interna, arteria mammaria interna
- MeSH: D008323
- TA98: A12.2.08.029
- TA2: 4576
- FMA: 3960

The internal thoracic artery (ITA), also known as the internal mammary artery, is an artery that supplies the anterior chest wall and the breasts. It is a paired artery, with one running along each side of the sternum, to continue after its bifurcation as the superior epigastric and musculophrenic arteries.

== Structure ==
The internal thoracic artery arises from the anterior surface of the subclavian artery near its origin. It has a width of between 1–2 mm.

It travels downward on the inside of the rib cage, approximately 1 cm from the sides of the sternum, and thus medial to the nipple. It is accompanied by the internal thoracic vein.

It runs deep to the abdominal external oblique muscle, but superficial to the vagus nerve.

In adults, the internal thoracic artery lies closest to the sternum at the first intercostal space. The gap between the artery and lateral border of the sternum increases when going downwards, up to 1.1 cm to 1.3 cm at the sixth intercostal space. In children, the gap ranges from 0.5 cm to 1.0 cm.

=== Branches ===
- Mediastinal branches
- Thymic branches
- Pericardiacophrenic artery – travels with the phrenic nerve
- Sternal branches
- Perforating branches
- Twelve anterior intercostal branches, two to each of the top six intercostal spaces. In a given space, the upper branch travels laterally along the bottom of the rib until it anastomoses with its corresponding posterior intercostal artery. The lower branch of the space anastomoses with a collateral branch of the posterior intercostal artery.

After passing the sixth intercostal space, the internal thoracic artery splits into the following two terminal branches:

- Musculophrenic artery – roughly follows the costal margin and it again gives branch for 7,8,9 ribs
- Superior epigastric artery – continues the course of the internal thoracic artery, travelling downward into the abdominal wall and to the content of rectus sheath

== Function ==
The internal thoracic artery supplies the chest wall and the breasts.

== Clinical significance ==
=== Use in bypass grafts ===
The internal thoracic artery is the cardiac surgeon's blood vessel of choice for coronary artery bypass grafting. The left ITA has a superior long-term patency to saphenous vein grafts and other arterial grafts (e.g. radial artery, gastroepiploic artery) when grafted to the left anterior descending coronary artery, generally the most important vessel, clinically, to revascularize.

Plastic surgeons may use either the left or right internal thoracic arteries for autologous free flap reconstruction of the breast after mastectomy. Usually, a microvascular anastomosis is performed at the second intercostal space to the artery on which the free flap is based.

== Additional images ==
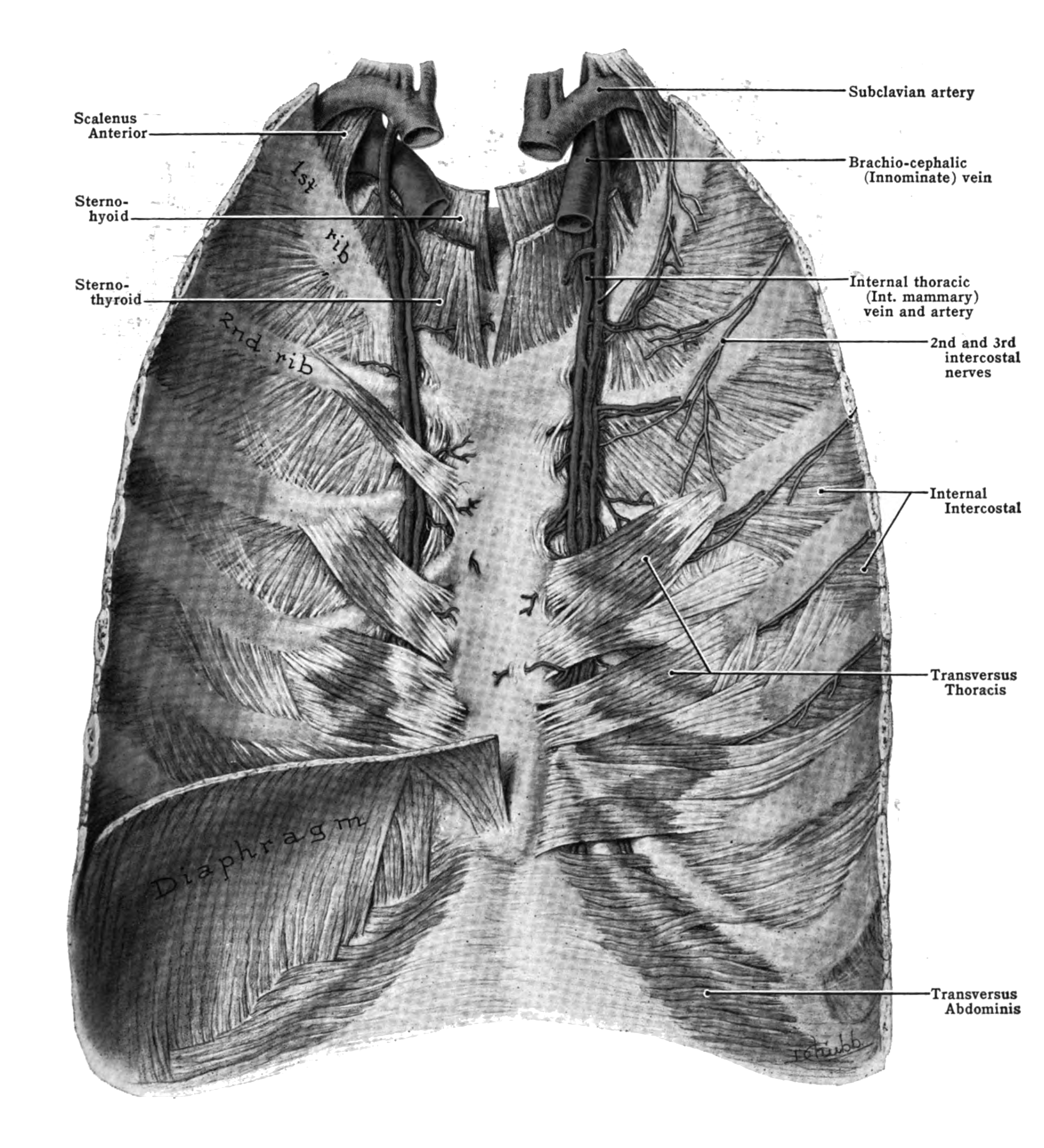
Anterior thoracic wall, from behind

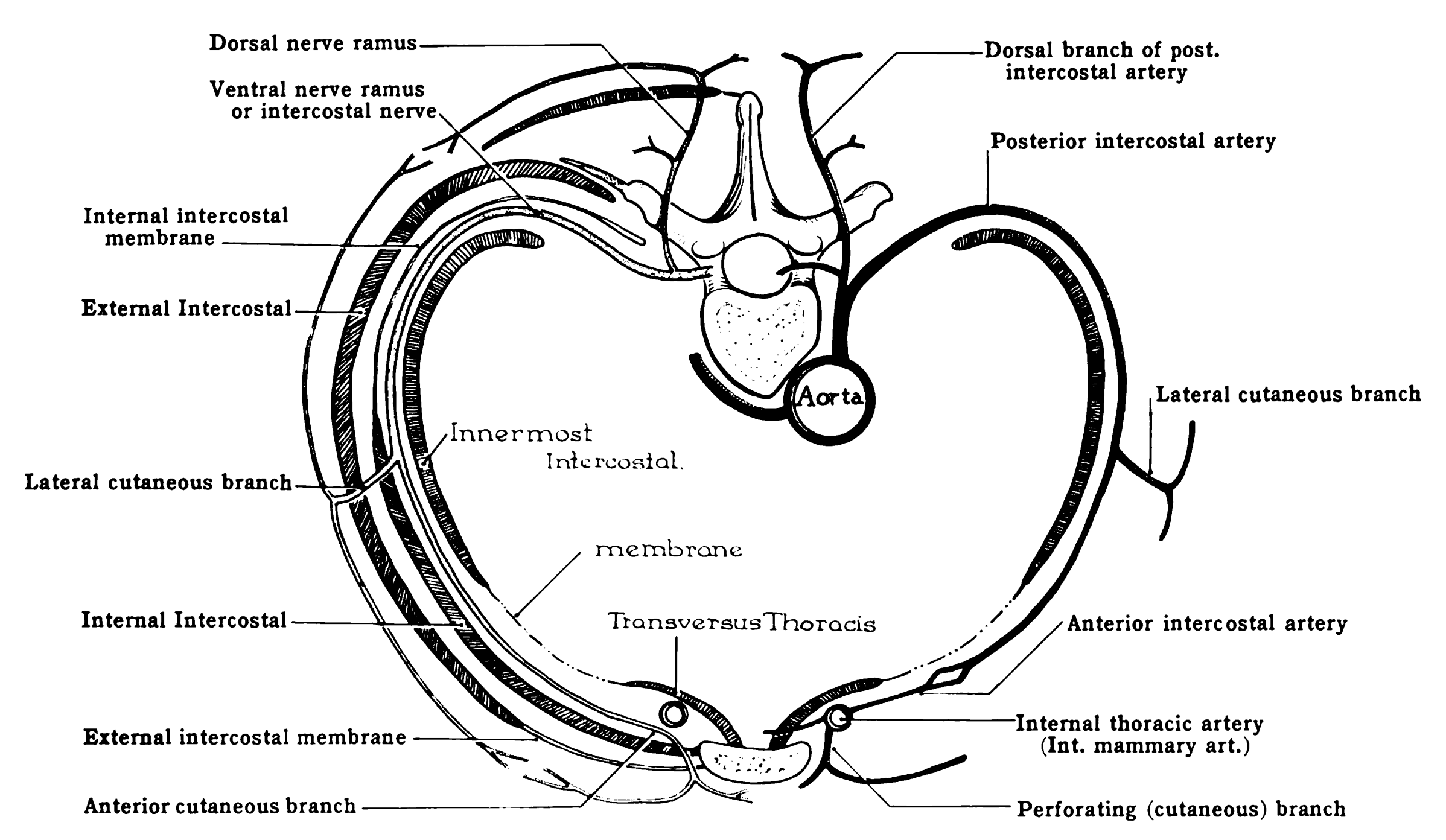
Diagram of an intercostal space
