= Subcostal vein =

Human vein along bottom of twelfth rib

Details
- Drains to: Ascending lumbar vein
- Artery: Subcostal artery

Identifiers
- Latin: vena subcostalis
- TA98: A12.3.07.013
- TA2: 4756, 4770
- FMA: 12845

The subcostal vein is a vein in the human body that runs along the bottom of the twelfth rib. It has the same essential qualities as the posterior intercostal veins, except that it cannot be considered intercostal because it is not between two ribs.

Each subcostal vein gives off a posterior (dorsal) branch which has a similar distribution to the posterior ramus of an intercostal artery.

== See also ==
- Subcostal nerve
- Subcostal artery
