= Common cardinal veins =

- Scheme of arrangement of parietal veins.

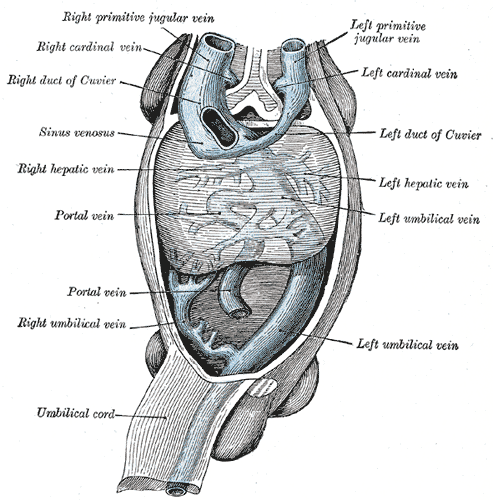
- Human embryo with heart and anterior body-wall removed to show the sinus venosus and its tributaries.

Details

Identifiers
- Latin: vena cardinalis communis

The common cardinal veins, also known as the ducts of Cuvier, are veins that drain into the sinus venosus during embryonic development. These drain an anterior cardinal vein and a posterior cardinal vein on each side. Each of the ducts of Cuvier receives an ascending vein. The ascending veins return the blood from the parietes of the trunk and from the Wolffian bodies, and are called cardinal veins. Part of the left common cardinal vein persists after birth to form the coronary sinus.

== Additional images ==
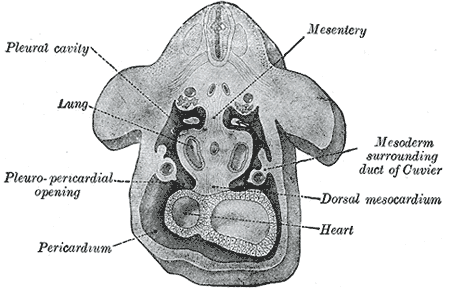
Figure obtained by combining several successive sections of a human embryo of about the fourth week.

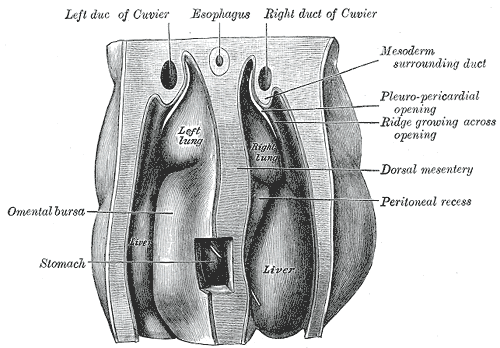
Upper part of celom of human embryo of 6.8 mm., seen from behind.

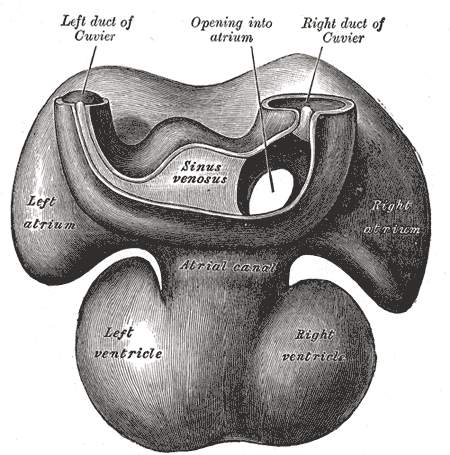
Dorsal surface of heart of human embryo of thirty-five days.

== See also ==
- Georges Cuvier
