= Posterior intercostal veins =

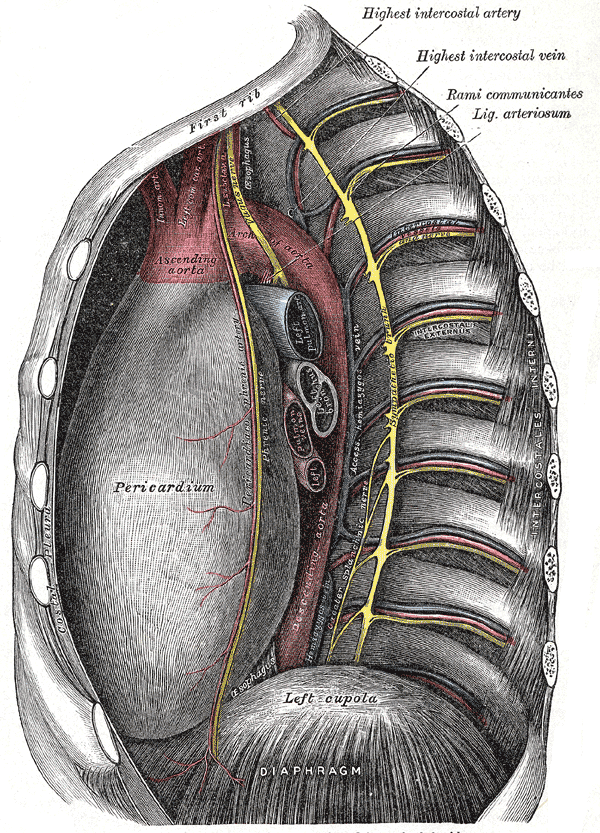
- The thoracic aorta, viewed from the left side. (Intercostals visible at right.)

Details
- Artery: Posterior intercostal arteries

Identifiers
- Latin: venae intercostales posteriores
- TA98: A12.3.07.014
- FMA: 70890

The posterior intercostal veins are veins that drain the intercostal spaces posteriorly. They run with their corresponding posterior intercostal artery on the underside of the rib, the vein superior to the artery. Each vein also gives off a dorsal branch that drains blood from the muscles of the back.

There are eleven posterior intercostal veins on each side. Their patterns are variable, but they are commonly arranged as:

- The 1st posterior intercostal vein, supreme intercostal vein, drains into the brachiocephalic vein or the vertebral vein.
- The 2nd and 3rd (and often 4th) posterior intercostal veins drain into the superior intercostal vein.
- The remaining posterior intercostal veins drain into the azygos vein on the right, or the hemiazygos and accessory hemiazygos vein on the left.
