= Venae cavae =

Large veins which return blood from the body into the heart

- The human heart and other structures, with superior and inferior vena cava labeled on left

Identifiers
- MeSH: D014684
- FMA: 321896

In anatomy, the venae cavae (/ˈviːni ˈkeɪvi/; sing. vena cava /ˈviːnə ˈkeɪvə/; from Latin 'hollow veins') are two large veins (great vessels) that return deoxygenated blood from the body into the heart. They are the main vein of the human body. In humans they are the superior vena cava and the inferior vena cava, and both empty into the right atrium. They are located slightly off-center, typically toward the right side of the body.

The right atrium receives deoxygenated blood through coronary sinus and two large veins called venae cavae. The inferior vena cava (or caudal vena cava in some animals) travels up alongside the abdominal aorta with blood from the lower part of the body. It is the largest vein in the human body.

The superior vena cava (or cranial vena cava in animals) is above the heart, and forms from a convergence of the left and right brachiocephalic veins, which contain blood from the head and the arms.

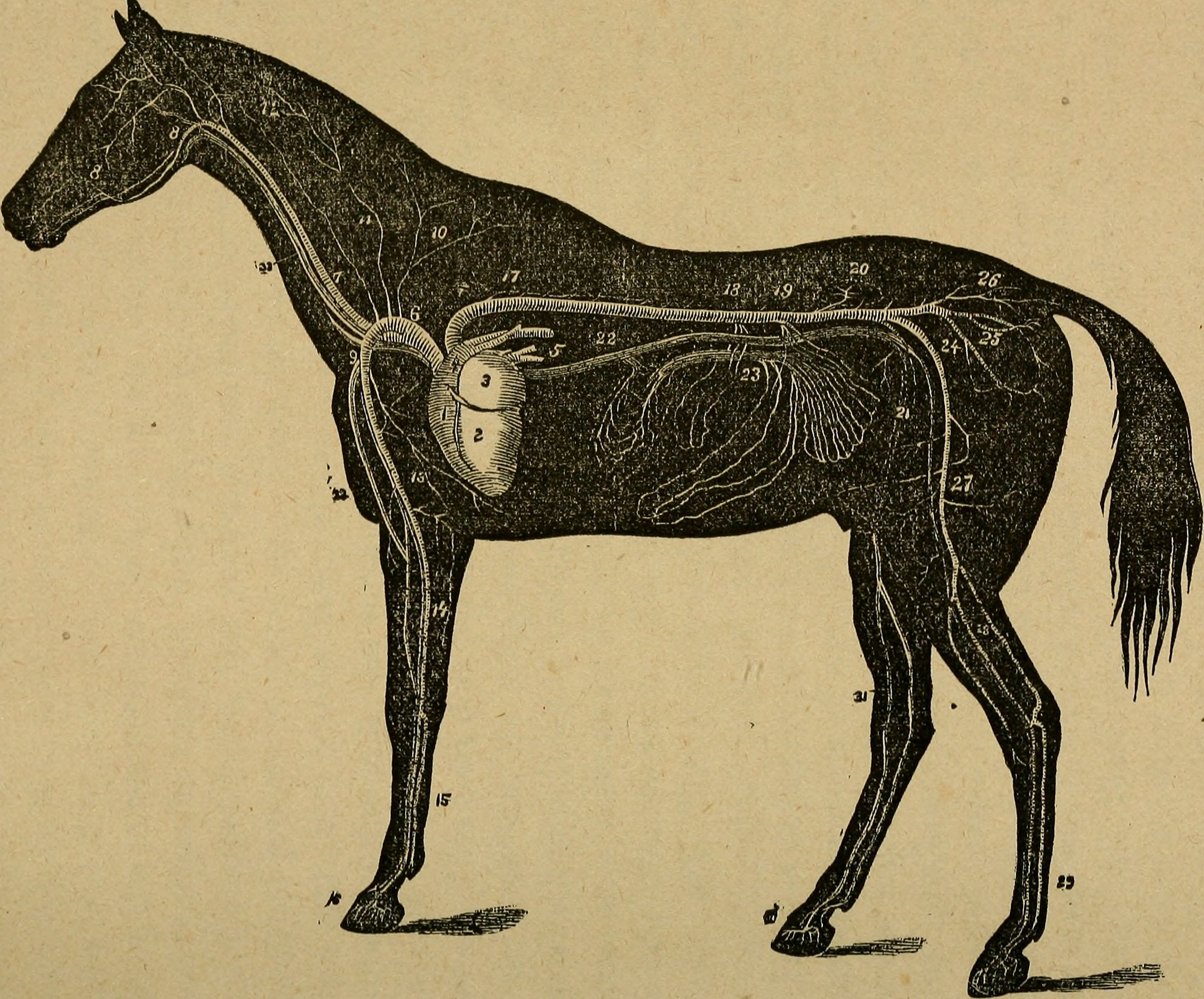
(made in (1883)) Anatomy of the horse, with other arteries: spermatic artery (21), which is posterior (posterior) to vena cava, venae portae, as well as the External iliac artery, and the mesenteric vessels, Internal iliac and renal arteries labelled. The posterior venae cavae (vena cava) is labelled 22.
