= Brachiocephalic vein =

Vein

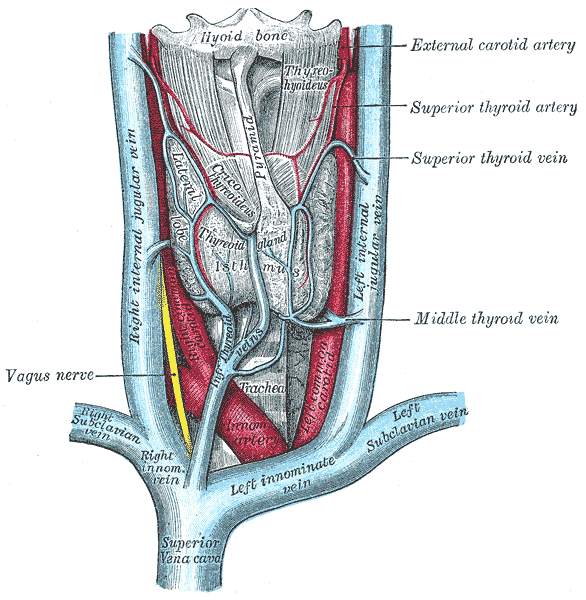
- The thyroid gland and its relations. (Label for "Right innom. vein" and "Left innom. vein" visible at bottom center.)

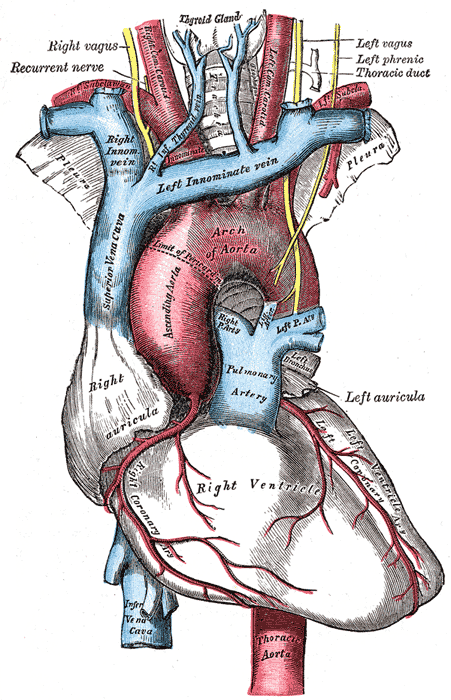
- The arch of the aorta, and its branches. (Right innom. vein labeled at upper right; left innominate vein labeled at center top.)

Details
- Source: Internal jugular subclavian superior intercostal vertebral inferior thyroid
- Drains to: Superior vena cava
- Artery: Brachiocephalic artery

Identifiers
- Latin: vena brachiocephalica vena anonyma
- MeSH: D016121
- TA98: A12.3.04.001
- TA2: 4772
- FMA: 4723

The left and right brachiocephalic veins (previously called innominate veins) are major veins in the upper chest, formed by the union of the ipsilateral internal jugular vein and subclavian vein (the so-called venous angle) behind the sternoclavicular joint. The left brachiocephalic vein is more than twice the length of the right brachiocephalic vein.

These veins merge to form the superior vena cava, a great vessel, posterior to the junction of the first costal cartilage with the manubrium of the sternum.

The brachiocephalic veins are the major veins returning blood to the superior vena cava.

== Left and right veins ==
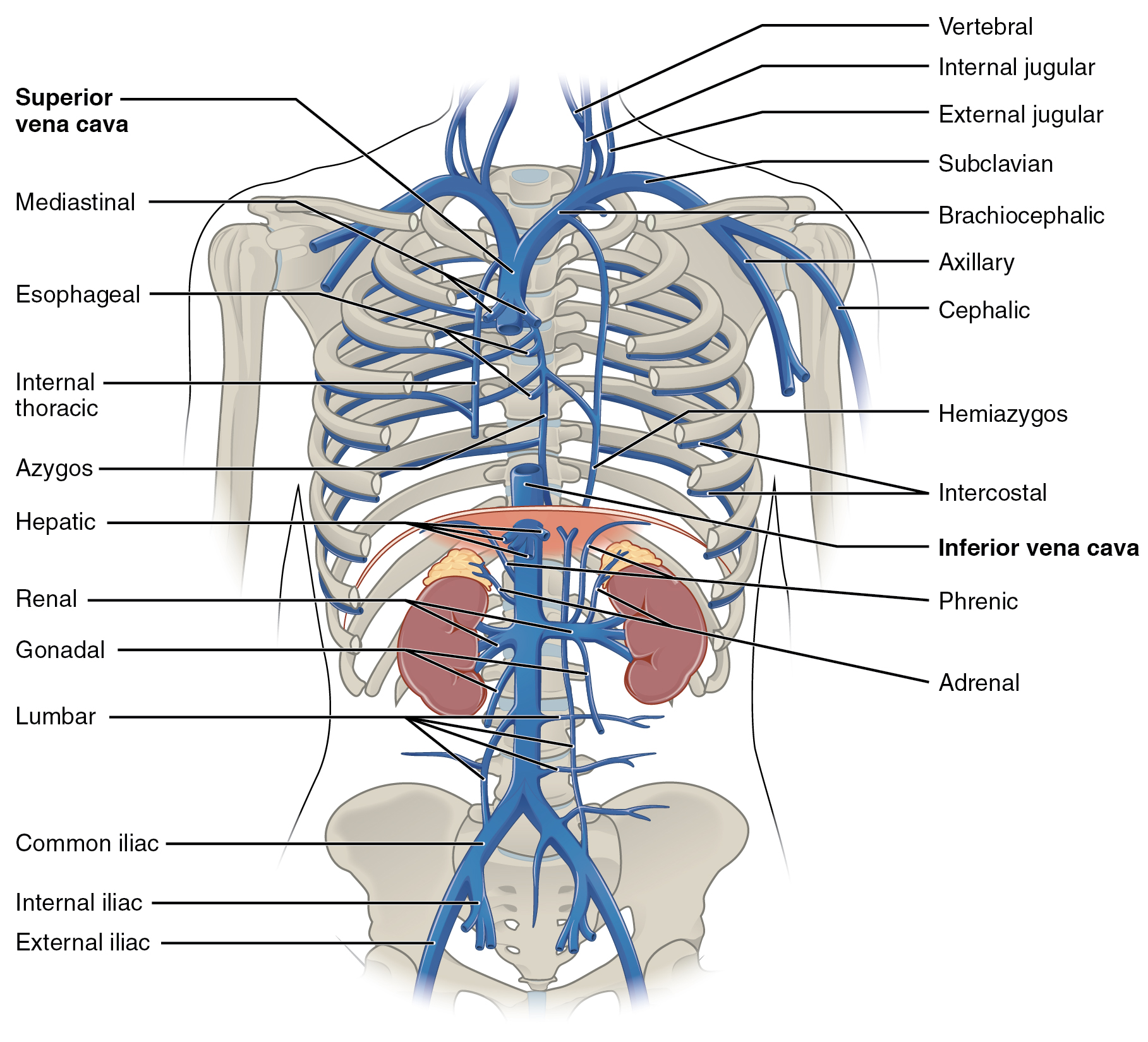
Veins of the thoracic and abdominal regions

=== Left brachiocephalic vein ===
The left brachiocephalic vein is about 6 cm long, more than twice the length of the right brachiocephalic vein, and is formed by the confluence of the left subclavian and left internal jugular veins. In addition, the left vein receives drainage from the following tributaries:

- The left vertebral vein, internal thoracic vein, inferior thyroid veins, superior intercostal veins, the thymic veins and the pericardial veins

=== Right brachiocephalic vein ===
The right brachiocephalic vein is about 2.5cm long. The right vein is formed by the confluence of the right subclavian vein and the right internal jugular vein. It receives the following tributaries:

- The right vertebral vein, the internal thoracic vein, and the thyroid veins, and occasionally from the first right posterior intercostal veins.

== Embryological origin ==
The left brachiocephalic vein develops from the anastomosis between the left and right anterior cardinal veins when the caudal segment of the left anterior cardinal vein degenerates.

== Additional images ==
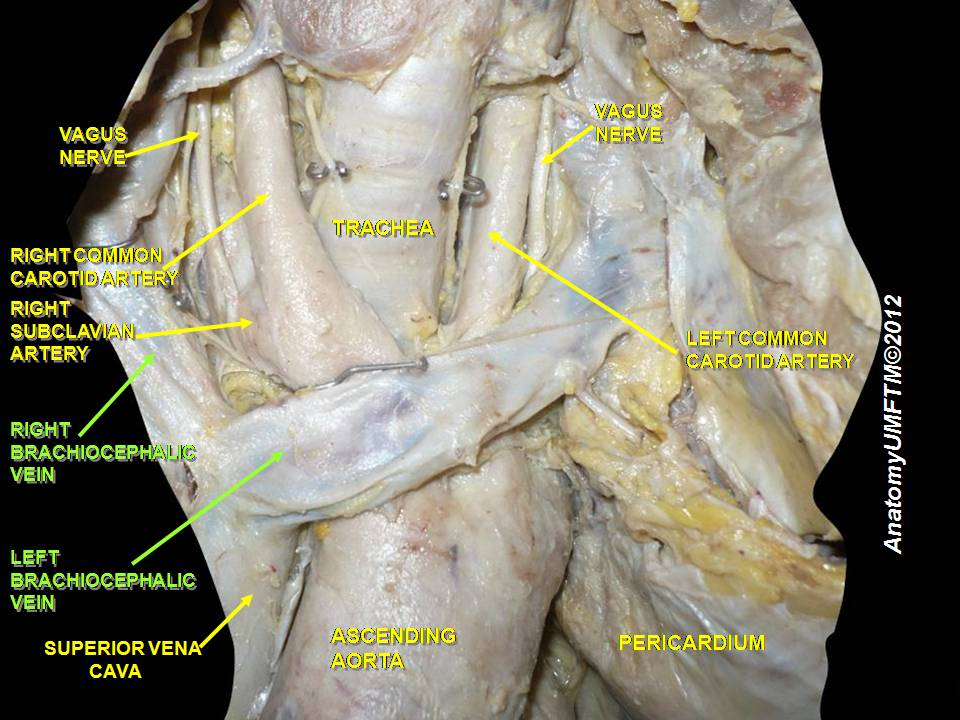
Right and left brachiocephalic vein

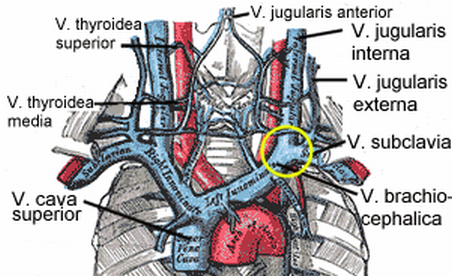
The brachiocephalic veins, superior vena cava, inferior vena cava, azygos vein and their tributaries.

== See also ==
- Hip bone (Innominate bone)
- Brachiocephalic artery (Innominate artery)
