= Alphonse Guérin =

French surgeon (1816–1895)

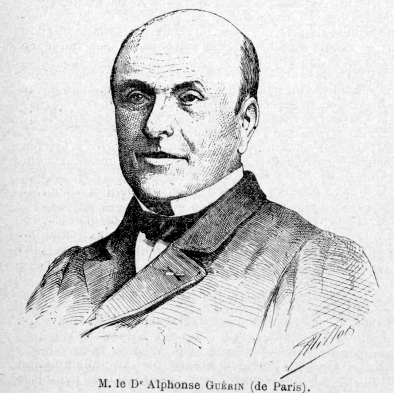
Alphonse Guérin

Alphonse François Marie Guérin (French pronunciation: [alfɔ̃s fʁɑ̃swa maʁi ɡeʁɛ̃]; August 9, 1816 – February 21, 1895) was a French surgeon who was a native of Ploërmel.

He studied medicine in Paris, and in 1850 became a surgeon of Parisian hospitals. During his career, he practiced surgery at the Lourcine, Cochin, Hôpital Saint-Louis and Hôtel-Dieu. In 1868 he became a member of the French Académie Nationale de Médecine.

In 1870, Guérin introduced the practice of using cotton-wool bandages for prevention of wound infections. He described a horizontal fracture of the maxilla immediately above the teeth and palate, that is known today as a "Le Fort I fracture", or sometimes as a "Guérin fracture".

== Associated eponyms ==
He was a specialist in urologic surgery, and has a handful of genitourinary terms that contain his name:

- "Guérin's glands": Today referred to as periurethral glands, or as Skene's glands.
- "Guérin's sinus": The lacuna magna; a diverticulum or cul-de-sac behind Guérin's valve (fold of navicular fossa).
- "Guérin's valve": Fold or valve of mucous membrane in the navicular fossa.

== Writings ==
- De la fièvre purulente, (doctoral thesis) Paris, 1847.
- Eléments de chirurgie opératoire, ou traité pratique des opérations. Paris, 1855; fourth edition, Paris, Lauwereyns, 1870.
- Maladies des organes génitaux externes de la femme. Leçons cliniques sur les maladies des organes génitaux internes de la femme. Paris, Vve. A. Delahaye & Cie. 1878.
