= Lacunae of Morgagni =

Small depressions in the male urethra

Details

Identifiers
- Latin: lacunae urethrales
- TA98: A09.4.02.024; A09.2.03.014
- TA2: 3463
- FMA: 76588

Lacunae of Morgagni, also called the urethral lacunae of the male urethra (lacunae urethralis, urethrae masculinae or the crypts of Morgagni), are small depressions or recesses on the surface of the mucous membrane of the urethra. Their openings are usually directed distally. The largest of these recesses is called lacuna magna (or the sinus of Guérin, or Guérin's sinus), which is situated on the upper surface of the fossa navicularis.

Located deeper within the lacunae are branching mucous tubules called the glands of Littre. The lacunae of Morgagni are named after Italian anatomist Giovanni Battista Morgagni (1682–1771).
