= Digital autopsy =

Autopsy of a body using digital media

A Virtual Autopsy is a non-invasive autopsy in which digital imaging technology, such as with computerized tomography (CT) or magnetic resonance imaging (MRI) scans, is used to develop three-dimensional images for a virtual exploration of a human body.

Virtual Autopsy, simply, means conducting autopsy in computerized environment by digital tools. The first step of digitizing starts with the medical imaging modalities that provide the raw data images from the deceased. The most common modalities are computerized tomography (CT scan) and magnetic resonance imaging (MRI) scanner. Three dimensional medical visualization is the technical process that provide the digital environment for exploration of the 3D body and conducting the Virtual Autopsy.

The term cannot be found before 1980 in the literature. However, there are many other similar terms like: Postmortem CT scanning for individual organs, volumetric radiologic scanning, Virtual Autopsy and Virtopsy.

== History ==
One of the first documented Virtual Autopsy studies was conducted at the department of Neuroradiology, University Hospital Mainz, Germany in the year 1980, where in 105 specimens of human stillborn and live-birth infants, ranging in age from gestational week 13 to postnatal month 18 were studied. Since then the arena of 2D CT scan images has gradually evolved to present day technologies of Multi-planar reconstructions (MPR) and real to life high definition 3D rendering. In the year 1998 various aspects of human and animal anatomy and pathology were successfully studied by Digital 3D examination on the ancient mummified specimens at the Academic Medical Centre, Amsterdam. Similar studies have also since then been done at the British Museum. The digital 3D analysis of data obtained from CT scanning the mummies has helped in visualization of the faces of some of the mummies, including that of chanters from the Temple of Karnak. This technology has also given vast information about the embalming and burial processes. In the year, 2009 CT scanning and digital analysis of DICOM data was successfully used by the VIFM, Australia during the phase 2 of the DVI process for the Victorian bushfires. All dead bodies and scattered remains were CT scanned in their body bags using specific protocols and analyzed. Digital examination helped not only in separating the presence of non-human remains, but also was useful at the time of autopsy to capture and analyze the identifying features in cases of severe disfiguration.

Currently Virtual Autopsy is being successfully used in many countries like Switzerland, The United States of America, The United Kingdom, Malaysia, and Japan. Radiologists may call it Post-mortem Computed Tomography (PMCT) that does not provide colourful 3D views. In Switzerland, it is called Virtopsy (virtual autopsy). Pathologists (Forensic pathologists) know this procedure as Virtual Autopsy.

== Concept ==
In a forensic autopsy or Post-mortem examination, body of deceased is examined to acquire information on the cause of death inclusive but not limited to manner of death in people dying sudden, unexpected, violent, drug-related, or otherwise suspicious deaths. Virtual Autopsy tries to answer the same investigative questions without actual dissection as in a conventional autopsy.

The main concept of Virtual Autopsy came into existence to overcome some problems during conventional autopsies without losing the objectivity of post-mortem examination. The main problems in conventional autopsy are:

- It is impossible to preserve the body after dissection and gather the findings with non-destructive and contamination-free procedures.
- Data acquisition in some body regions are difficult to somehow impossible, particularly in cases of decomposition.
- Observer-independent documentation of the evidence is not available
- Data acquisition of the body with respect for the deceased, next of kin and religious obligations
- Slow and incomplete data acquisition in disasters

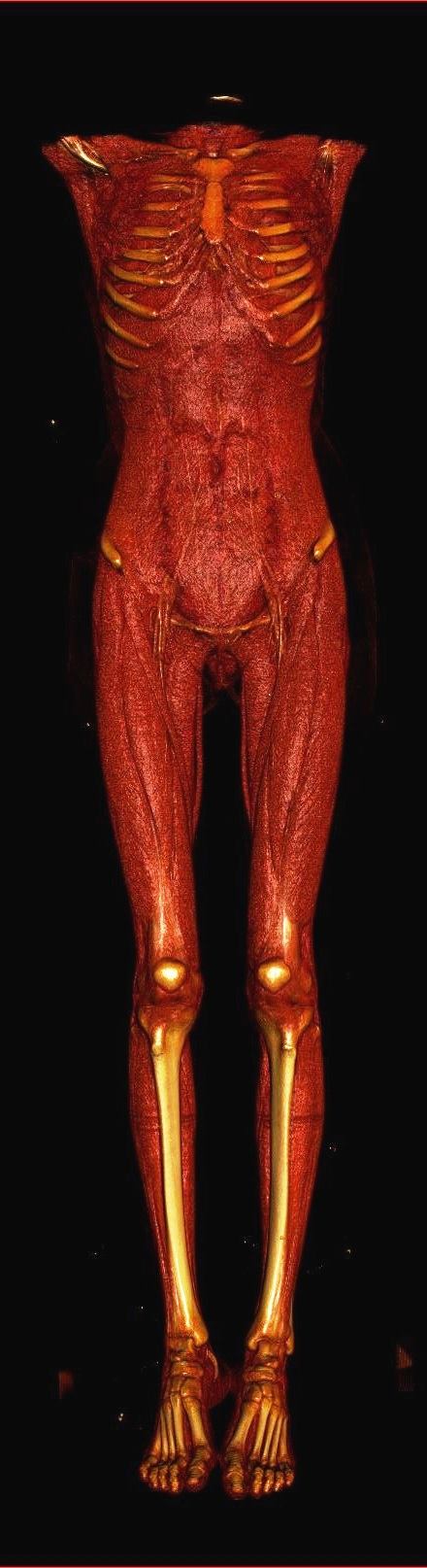
Showing only the muscles of the three dimensional body (This picture is created by iDASS and copyrighted to iGene Sdn. Bhd.)

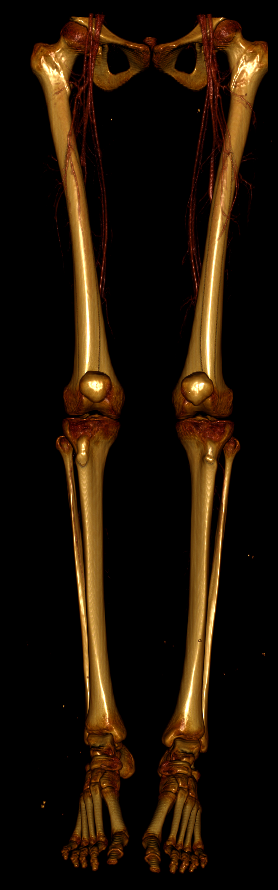
Showing only the bony skeleton of the three dimensional body(This picture is created by iDASS and copyrighted to iGene Sdn. Bhd.)

Virtual Autopsy would be a technical solution for above mentioned problems. Employing medical imaging modalities like CT or MRI scanners is the first step in order to examine the deceased visually without any destructive, contaminating and non-preservative procedures like dissection. Moreover, using these images with software processing in visualization is the second step toward acquiring data from difficult regions from anatomical perspective and dignity of the body. Digital bodies in the system can be examined multiple times and reported not only in text but also in variety of available media (photo, movie, etc.). In addition, quick evaluation of bodies and body parts in massive disasters is available in comparison to time-consuming procedure of conventional autopsy.

However, there are few limitations in Virtual Autopsy. The main constraint is the data that is provided by medical imaging modalities are based on X-Ray and Magnetic fields (CT and MRI) that limits the view to what can be recorded by these technologies. A very obvious difference is the real colour of internal body organs and their changes in the deceased, in comparison to what is simulated in the visualization software. The novelty of this technological solution has not given enough time for studies on the consistency of reports among different professionals on the same cases. Moreover, there are few articles about validity of Virtual Autopsy in action.

== Technology ==
Computed tomography and MRI scanning are the most common imaging modalities employed for this Virtual Autopsy. Furthermore, CT Angiography has been used to provide the imaging data for analysing the deceased. The work output of these modalities are standard image files (DICOM files). Each image may have a thickness of 5mm, which means after whole body scan (human average height of 175 cm) it would produce 3500 images (slices) of human body. Using volume rendering these two dimensional images are assembled to make a 3D projection of human body. The 3D model is painted through RGBA transfer function to a colourful model. All visualization and image processing features for manipulating and navigating this 3D model make digital tools for conducting a Virtual Autopsy. These features enable pathologist to explore the entire body and examine interested regions and organs from different angles. Image processing algorithms help them to virtually remove layers of body tissues like skin, muscle and bones. Moreover, low density objects like air and high density objects like metallic foreign bodies can be marked and viewed in the three dimensional body. For instance, organs with air (inside) like sinuses or intestines can be separated from other parts or any remnants of bullet in body due to gunshot injuries.

== Conducting an autopsy ==
The process starts with registration of the case with all corresponding meta-data in a Virtual Autopsy Facility. The best place for these facilities are in neighbourhood of mortuaries because of considerations about security, carriage and body condition. The body would be scanned according to the schedule with proper adjustments for deceased body. It means there are different configuration for emitting the ray in deceased in comparison to live bodies. This step may take 5 – 10 minutes depends on the abilities of scanner. The output is aforementioned DICOM files (around 3500 files for whole body scan) that would be sent for visualization process. The result is a colourful 3D body that can be explored and examined for positive or negative findings with the digital tools. The process is not finished with 3D exploration. The findings would be reported digitally in a multimedia report. This report includes all textual results accompanied by images and recorded movie of Virtual Autopsy during examination. This report is not only for common submission to the court but also to be displayed in the court for attendance.

== Acceptance ==
There are not many justice systems around the world who have accepted the Virtual Autopsy as their legal procedures of forensic investigations. While Switzerland is pioneering in the acceptance, countries like Israel with strong religious background does not accept forensic imaging as a substitute or in conjunction with autopsy report. This might be due to lack of cases and documentation. Some researchers tried to evaluate the reliability of Virtual Autopsy in comparison with conventional (standard) autopsy that reveals totally 68% accuracy of Virtual Autopsy regarding the pathogenetic mechanisms.

In UK, the Department of Health is currently considering recommendations for an integrated national cross-sectional autopsy imaging service, based on a regional service provided by mortuary-based imaging centres. Furthermore, Royal College of Radiologists and the Royal College of Pathologists prepared a document to standardize medico-legal post-mortem cross-sectional imaging in adults in the UK.
