= NTVG =

NTVG may refer to:

- No Te Va Gustar, Uruguayan rock band
- Nederlands Tijdschrift voor Geneeskunde, Dutch medical journal
