= Giovanni Battista Morgagni =

Italian anatomist (1682–1771)

- Contemporary Portrait of Giovanni Battista Morgagni
- Born: 25 February 1682; Forlì, Papal States
- Died: 6 December 1771 (aged 89); Padua, Republic of Venice
- Education: University of Bologna
- Known for: Anatomical pathology
- Scientific career
- Fields: Anatomist
- Workplaces: University of Padua
- Academic advisors: Antonio Maria Valsalva
- Notable students: Antonio Scarpa

Giovanni Battista Morgagni (25 February 1682 – 6 December 1771) was an Italian anatomist, generally regarded as the father of modern anatomical pathology, who taught thousands of medical students from many countries during his 56 years as Professor of Anatomy at the University of Padua.

His most significant literary contribution, the monumental five-volume On the Seats and Causes of Disease, embodied a lifetime of experience in anatomical dissection and observation, and established the fundamental principle that most diseases are not vaguely dispersed throughout the body, but originate locally, in specific organs and tissues.

== Education ==
His parents were in comfortable circumstances, but not of the nobility; it appears from his letters to Giovanni Maria Lancisi that Morgagni had ambitions to improve his rank. It may be inferred that he succeeded from the fact that he is described on a memorial tablet at Padua as nobilis forolensis, "noble of Forlì", apparently by right of his wife. At the age of sixteen he went to Bologna to study philosophy and medicine, and graduated with much praise as a doctor in both faculties three years later, in 1701. He acted as prosector to Antonio Maria Valsalva (one of the distinguished pupils of Malpighi), who held the office of demonstrator anatomicus in the Bologna school, and whom he assisted more particularly in preparing his celebrated work on the Anatomy and Diseases of the Ear, published in 1704.

== Career ==
=== Early career ===
Many years after, in 1740, Morgagni edited a collected edition of Valsalva's writings, with important additions to the treatise on the ear, and with a memoir of the author. When Valsalva was transferred to Parma Morgagni succeeded to his anatomical demonstratorship. At this period he enjoyed a high repute in Bologna; he was made president of the Academia Enquietorum when in his twenty-second year, and he is said to have signalized his tenure of the presidential chair by discouraging abstract speculations, and by setting the fashion towards exact anatomical observation and reasoning.

He published the substance of his communications to the academy in 1706 under the title of Adversaria anatomica, the first of a series by which he became favorably known throughout Europe as an accurate anatomist; the book included Observations of the Larynx, the Lachrymal Apparatus, and the Pelvic Organs in the Female. After a time he gave up his post at Bologna, and occupied himself for the next two or three years at Padua, where he had a friend in Domenico Guglielmini (1655–1710), professor of medicine, but better-known as a writer on physics and mathematics, whose works he afterwards edited (1719) with a biography. Guglielmini desired to see him settled as a teacher at Padua, and the unexpected death of Guglielmini himself made the project feasible, Antonio Vallisneri (1661–1730) being transferred to the vacant chair, and Morgagni succeeding to the chair of theoretical medicine. He came to Padua in the spring of 1712, being then in his thirty-first year, and he taught medicine there with much success until his death on 6 December 1771.

=== Middle career ===
When he had been three years in Padua, which at the time was part of the Republic of Venice, an opportunity occurred for his promotion (by the Venetian Senate) to the chair of anatomy. In this prestigious position he became the successor of an illustrious line of scholars, including Vesalius, Gabriele Falloppio, Geronimo Fabrizio, Giulio Cesare Casseri, and Adriaan van den Spiegel, and enjoyed a stipend that was increased from time to time by vote of the senate until it reached twelve hundred gold ducats. Shortly after coming to Padua he married a noble lady of Forlì, who bore him three sons and twelve daughters.

Morgagni enjoyed an unequaled popularity among all classes. He was of tall and dignified figure, with blonde hair and lilac eyes, and with a frank and happy expression; his manners were polished, and he was noted for the elegance of his Latin style. He lived in harmony with his colleagues, who are said not even to have envied him his unprecedentedly large stipend; his house and lecture-theatre were frequented tanquam officina sapientiae by students of all ages, attracted from all parts of Europe; he enjoyed the friendship and favor of distinguished Venetian senators and of cardinals; and successive popes conferred honours upon him.

Before he had been long in Padua the students of the German nation, of all the faculties there, elected him their patron, and he advised and assisted them in the purchase of a house to be a German library and club, for all time. He was elected into the imperial Caesareo-Leopoldina Academy in 1708 (originally located at Schweinfurth), and to a higher grade in 1732, into the Royal Society in 1724, into the Paris Academy of Sciences in 1731, the St. Petersburg Academy in 1735, and the Berlin Academy of Sciences in 1754. Among his more celebrated pupils were Antonio Scarpa (who died in 1832, connecting the school of Morgagni with the modern era), Domenico Cotugno (1736–1822), and Leopoldo Marco Antonio Caldani (1725–1813), the author of the magnificent atlas of anatomical plates published in 2 volumes at Venice in 1801–1814.

In his earlier years at Padua, Morgagni brought out five more series of the Adversaria anatomica (1717–1719); these his strictly medical publications were few and casual (on gallstones, varices of the Venae cavae, cases of stone, and several memoranda on medico-legal points, drawn up at the request of the curia). Classical scholarship in those years occupied his pen more than anatomical observation.

=== Late career ===
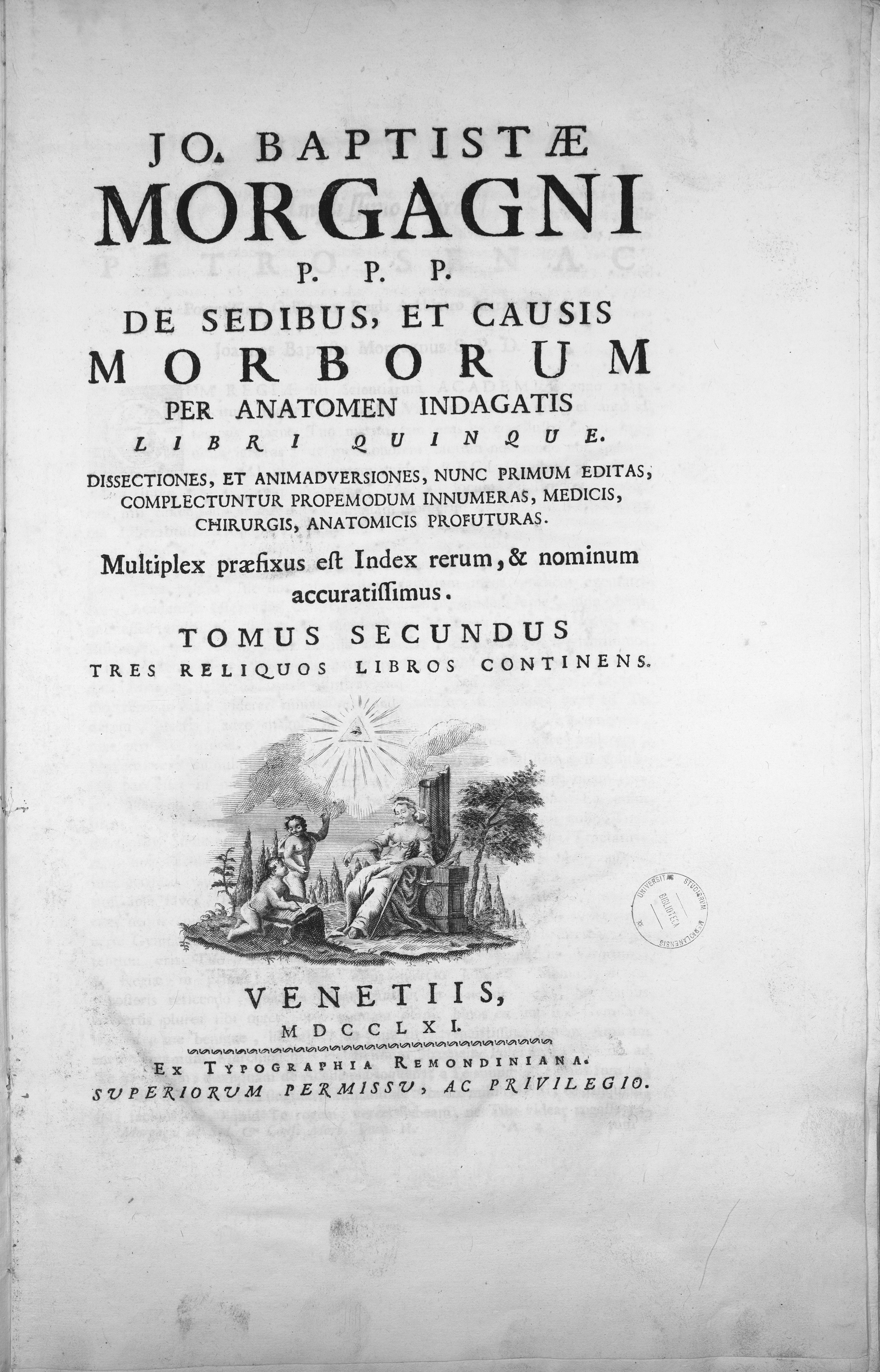
De sedibus, 1765

It was not until 1761, when he was in his eightieth year, that he brought out the great work which, once for all, made pathological anatomy a science, and diverted the course of medicine into new channels of exactness or precision—the De Sedibus et causis morborum per anatomen indagatis "Of the seats and causes of diseases investigated through anatomy", in five books printed as two folio volumes, which during the succeeding ten years, notwithstanding its bulk, was reprinted several times (thrice in four years) in its original Latin, and was translated into French (1765, republished 1820), English (1769), and German languages (1771). In 1769, he gave possibly the first description of what was later named Crohn's disease.

The only special treatise on pathological anatomy previous to that of Morgagni was the work of Théophile Bonet of Neuchâtel, Sepulchretum: sive anatomia practica ex cadaveribus morbo denatis, "The Cemetery, or, anatomy practiced from corpses dead of disease", first published (Geneva, 2 vols. folio) in 1679, three years before Morgagni was born; it was republished at Geneva (3 vols., folio) in 1700, and again at Leiden in 1709. Although the normal anatomy of the body had been comprehensively, and in some parts exhaustively, written by Vesalius and Falloppio, it had not occurred to any one to examine and describe systematically the anatomy of diseased organs and parts. Harvey, a century after Vesalius, poignantly remarks that there is more to be learned from the dissection of one person who had died of tuberculosis or other chronic malady than from the bodies of ten persons who had been hanged.

Francis Glisson indeed (1597–1677) shows in a passage quoted by Bonet in the preface to the Sepulchretum, that he was familiar with the idea, at least, of systematically comparing the state of the organs in a series of bodies, and of noting those conditions which invariably accompanied a given set of symptoms. The work of Bonet was, however, the first attempt at a system of morbid anatomy, and, although it dwelt mostly upon curiosities and monstrosities, it enjoyed much repute in its day; Haller speaks of it as an immortal work, which may in itself serve for a pathological library.

Morgagni, in the preface to his own work, discusses the defects and merits of the Sepulchretum: it was largely a compilation of other men's cases, well and ill authenticated; it was prolix, often inaccurate and misleading from ignorance of the normal anatomy, and it was wanting in what would now be called objective impartiality, a quality which was introduced as decisively into morbid anatomy by Morgagni as it had been introduced two centuries earlier into normal human anatomy by Vesalius.

Morgagni has narrated the circumstances under which the De Sedibus took origin. Having finished his edition of Valsalva in 1740, he was taking a holiday in the country, spending much of his time in the company, of a young friend who was curious in many branches of knowledge. The conversation turned upon the Sepulchretum of Bonet, and it was suggested to Morgagni by his dilettante friend that he should put on record his own observations. It was agreed that letters on the anatomy of diseased, organs and parts should be written for the perusal of this favoured youth (whose name is not mentioned); and they were continued from time to time until they numbered seventy. Those seventy letters constitute the De sedibus et causis morborum, which was given to the world as a systematic treatise in 2 vols., folio (Venice, 1761), twenty years after the task of epistolary instruction was begun.

The letters are arranged in five books, treating of the morbid conditions of the body a capite ad calcem, and together containing the records of some 646 dissections. Some of these are given at great length, and with a precision of statement and exhaustiveness of detail hardly surpassed in the so-called protocols of the German pathological institutes of the present time; others, again, are fragments brought in to elucidate some question that had arisen. The symptoms during the course of the malady and other antecedent circumstances are always prefixed with more or less fullness, and discussed from the point of view of the conditions found after death. Subjects in all ranks of life, including several cardinals, figure in this remarkable gallery of the dead. Many of the cases are taken from Morgagni's early experiences at Bologna, and from the records of his teachers Valsalva and I.F. Albertini (1662–1738) not elsewhere published. They are selected and arranged with method and purpose, and they are often (and somewhat casually) made the occasion of a long excursus on general pathology and medicine.

== Legacy ==
During his career as a physician, Morgagni kept extensive notes on his medical consultations. These writings document his clinical practice and anatomical observations and provide insight into the development of his anatomical studies in relation to patient care. They also offer a perspective on medical practice in the 18th century.

The range of Morgagni's scholarship, as evidenced by his references to early and contemporary literature, was very broad. It has been contended that he was himself not free from prolixity, the besetting sin of the learned; and certainly the form and arrangement of his treatise are such as to make it difficult to use by subsequent practitioners, notwithstanding that it is well indexed in the original edition, in that of Tissot (3 vols., 4to, Yverdon, 1779), and in more recent editions. It differs from modern treatises insofar as the symptoms determine the order and manner of presenting the anatomical facts.

His 1769 work described the post mortem findings of air in cerebral circulation and surmised this was the cause of death. Although Morgagni's cases resulted from gas embolism due to damage to the bowel, the same pathology is seen in decompression illness. Although Morgagni was the first to understand and to demonstrate the absolute necessity of basing diagnosis, prognosis, and treatment on an exact and comprehensive knowledge of anatomical conditions, he made no attempt (like that of the Vienna school sixty years later) to exalt pathological anatomy into a science disconnected from clinical medicine and remote from practical experience with the scalpel. His precision, his exhaustiveness, and his freedom from bias are his essentially modern or scientific qualities; his scholarship and high consideration for classical and foreign work, his sense of practical ends (or his common sense), and the breadth of his intellectual horizon prove him to have lived before medical science had become largely technical or mechanical.

His treatise was the commencement of the era of steady, or cumulative progress in pathology and in practical medicine. From that time on, symptoms ceased to be made up into more or less conventional groups, each of which was a disease; on the other hand, they began to be viewed as the cry of the suffering organs, and it became possible to develop Thomas Sydenham's grand conception of a natural history of disease in a catholic or scientific spirit.

A biography of Morgagni by Mosca was published at Naples in 1768. His life may also be read in Angelo Fabroni's Vitae Italorum Doctrina Excellentium, and a convenient abridgment of Fabroni's memoir will be found prefixed to Tissot's edition of the De Sedibus et Causis Morborum. A collected edition of his works was published at Venice in 5 volumes, in 1765.

== Eponymous structures ==
- Aortic sinuses ("Aortic Sinuses of Morgagni"), more commonly known as Sinuses of Valsalva
- Columns of Morgagni
- Foramina of Morgagni
- Hypermature cataract ("Morgagnian cataract")
- Hydatid of Morgagni
- Morgagni's hernia
- Lacunae of Morgagni
- Morgagni Stewart Morel syndrome
- Sinus of Morgagni (pharynx)

The concept of "congestion of the brain", while not named after Morgagni, was introduced by him in 1761 and widely used for various conditions including stroke until hypertension was understood.

== Sources ==
- Morgagni GB (October 1903). "Founders of Modern Medicine: Giovanni Battista Morgagni. (1682–1771)". Medical Library and History Journal. 1 (4): 270–7. PMC 1698114. PMID 18340813.
- This article incorporates text from a publication now in the public domain: Creighton, Charles (1911). "Morgagni, Giovanni Battista". In Chisholm, Hugh (ed.). Encyclopædia Britannica. Vol. 18 (11th ed.). Cambridge University Press. pp. 831–833.
- Zani, Augusto; Cozzi Denis A (April 2008). "Giovanni Battista Morgagni and his contribution to pediatric surgery". J. Pediatr. Surg. 43 (4): 729–33. doi:10.1016/j.jpedsurg.2007.12.065. PMID 18405723.
- Androutsos, G (2006). "Giovanni-Battista Morgagni (1682–1773): creator of pathological anatomy". Journal of the Balkan Union of Oncology. 11 (1): 95–101. PMID 17318961.
- Molenaar, J C (December 2001). "[From the library of the Dutch Journal of Medicine. Giovanni Battista Morgagni: De sedibus, et causis morborum per anatomen indagatis, 1761]". Nederlands Tijdschrift voor Geneeskunde. 145 (51): 2487–92. PMID 11789156.
- Ventura, H O (October 2000). "Giovanni Battista Morgagni and the foundation of modern medicine". Clinical Cardiology. 23 (10): 792–4. doi:10.1002/clc.4960231021. PMC 6654806. PMID 11061062.
- Fogazzi, G B (January 1998). "Kidney diseases in the major work of Giovanni Battista Morgagni". Nephrol. Dial. Transplant. 13 (1): 211–2. doi:10.1093/ndt/13.1.211. PMID 9481746.
- Thiene, G; Pennelli N (October 1983). "[Third centenary of the birth of Giovanni Battista Morgagni (1682–1982): is there still need for the autopsy?]". Giornale Italiano di Cardiologia. 13 (10): 262–4. PMID 6365669.
- Valvo, J R; Cos L R; Cockett A T (October 1983). "Giovanni Battista Morgagni: his contributions to urology". Urology. 22 (4): 452–7. doi:10.1016/0090-4295(83)90440-5. PMID 6356560.
- Messini, M; Messini R (November 1972). "[Therapeutic prescriptions of Giovanni Battista Morgagni. (Bicentennial anniversary of his death)]". La Clinica Terapeutica. 63 (4): 359–87. PMID 4566208.
- Hewitt, WH (September 1972). "Archives of the forensic sciences Miscellaneous minor works of Giovanni Battista Morgagni". Forensic Science. 1 (3): 339–378. doi:10.1016/0300-9432(72)90032-5. PMID 4566611.
- Belitskaia, E Ia (1971). "[Giovanni Battista Morgagni—founder of pathological anatomy and the 1st scientific classification and nomenclature of diseases and causes of death (1682–1771)]". Sovetskoe Zdravookhranenie. 30 (10): 73–5. PMID 4946783.
- Temkin, O (March 1967). "Giovanni Baptista Morgagni (1682–1771)". Investigative Urology. 4 (5): 504–6. PMID 5335750.
- "Faces of the Great. Giovanni Battista Morgagni, 1682–1771". Clinical Notes on Respiratory Diseases. 4: 12–3. 1965. PMID 14281110.
- Schulte, J E (May 1963). "[Giovanni Battista MORGAGNI.]". Nederlands Tijdschrift voor Geneeskunde. 107: 961–3. PMID 13987182.
- Tedeschi, C G (September 1961). "Giovanni Battista Morgagni, the founder of pathologic anatomy. A biographic sketh, on the occasion of the 200th anniversary of the publication of his "De sedibus et causis morborum per anatomen indagatis"". Boston Medical Quarterly. 12: 112–25. PMID 14037836.
- Spina, G (November 1956). "[Aging, body constitution and personality in two unpublished lessons of Giovanni Battista Morgagni.]". Le Scalpel. 109 (45): 1159–64. PMID 13390805.
- Schadewaldt, H (February 1955). "[The gynecological works of Giovanni Battista Morgagni, the founder of modern pathological anatomy.]". Deutsches Medizinisches Journal. 6 (3–4): 126–31. PMID 14365489.
