= Jean-Jacques Belloc =

French surgeon and creator of forensic medicine in France

Jean Jacques Belloc
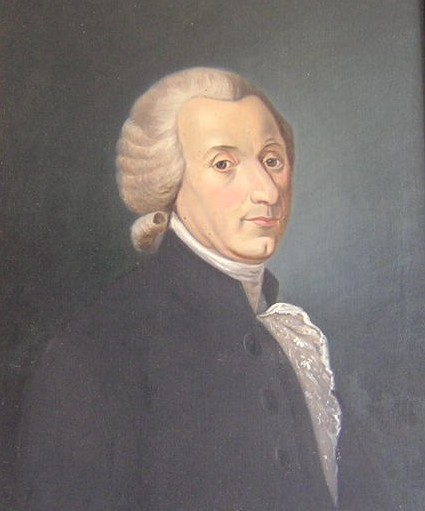
- Born: 1730
- Died: 1807 (aged 76–77)
- Occupations: Physician and surgeon

Jean-Jacques Belloc (1730 in Saint-Maurin in Quercy – October 23, 1807, in Agen) was a French surgeon and creator of forensic medicine in France.

== Biography ==
He was a son of a surgeon, he was a pupil of the college of Montpellier then studied medicine and surgery at the University of Montpellier, then at the Faculty of Medicine of Paris. He received his master in surgery in Paris in 1754 and in spite of his titles of lieutenant of the first surgeon of the King and professor of legal medicine, he had settled in Agen in 1768 and had founded there, in the old tower of Saint-Côme, in next to the large cemetery of Sainte-Foy, a school of surgery which flourished until the revolution.

There he autopsied corpses that he dug up with the help of his students. He invented several surgical instruments, including the probe that bears his name (Belloc probe or cannula). Rightly considered as the creator in France of forensic medicine, Belloc is the author of numerous memoirs, notably on animal magnetism and smallpox, which he had made his specialty.

== Publications ==
- Physical, philosophical and medical topography of the department of Lot-et-Garonne, Agen, 1806
- Course in judicial, theoretical and practical forensic medicine Paris: impr. of the Society of Medicine, (year IX, 1811, 1819) FRBNF30080952
