= Moe Levine =

American lawyer

Moe Levine (1908–1974) was an American lawyer.

== Biography ==
Levine completed his studies at City College and later at Brooklyn Law School.

During his career, Levine worked for the American Trial Lawyers Association for the Second Circuit and later became a partner at Shayne, Dachs & Moe Levine, based in Mineola, Long Island. He served as a director for the New York State Trial Lawyers Association and was also a fellow at the International Academy of Law and Sciences. He also lectured on topics of forensic medicine and medical malpractice.

Levine is best known for a series titled The Best of Moe, which focused on trial work.

== Bibliography ==
- Moe Levine on Advocacy: Trial Guides
