= Forensic medicine =

Group of medical specialties

Forensic medicine is a vague term used to describe a group of medical specialties which deal with the examination and diagnosis of individuals who have been injured by or who have died because of external or unnatural causes such as poisoning, assault, suicide and other forms of violence, and apply findings to law (i.e. court cases). Forensic medicine is a multi-disciplinary branch which includes the practice of forensic pathology, forensic psychiatry, forensic odontology, forensic radiology and forensic toxicology. There are two main categories of forensic medicine; Clinical forensic medicine; Pathological forensics medicine, with the differing factor being the condition of the patients. In clinical forensic medicine it is the investigation of trauma to living patients, whereas pathological forensic medicine involves the examination of traumas to the deceased to find the cause of death.

== History ==
The term clinical forensic medicine, coined by Thomas Stuart, dates back to the 19th century, referring to the connection between the usage of medical evidence for judiciary purposes. Although this form of forensics medicine has been used before this term was conceived. However, clinical forensics could not be considered a thing until both legal and medical systems were well developed. But, there has been evidence of some form of forensics as far back as 220B.C.E., in the Qin Dynasty, where evidence of linking medical and legal systems were written out. Forensic medicine emerged as a discipline in France in the late 18th century.

Pathological forensic medicine was not considered as its own subfield until 1819, when Joan Lobstein was appointed the position of Professorship of Pathology at the University of Strassburg. However, forensic pathology has been used throughout history to determine cause all factors of a death (e.g. mechanism, etc.) by examining the body of the deceased. Autopsies of animals were conducted as early as 400 B.C.E. Until the 13th century the body of the deceased were considered holy and could not be operated on. However, around 1231 C.E. the first law that allowed for the dissection and observation of a human body. This led to further easing on the concept of human autopsies, as more and more occurred. This development led to many advancements in pathology as the human body was properly mapped for its structure and function, and studied for the causes of diseases. This led to the overall increase in health as ancient technique were rid of, and new scientific medical practices were implemented.

== See also ==
- Jean-Jacques Belloc
