= Théophile Bonet =

Swiss anatomist (1620-1689)

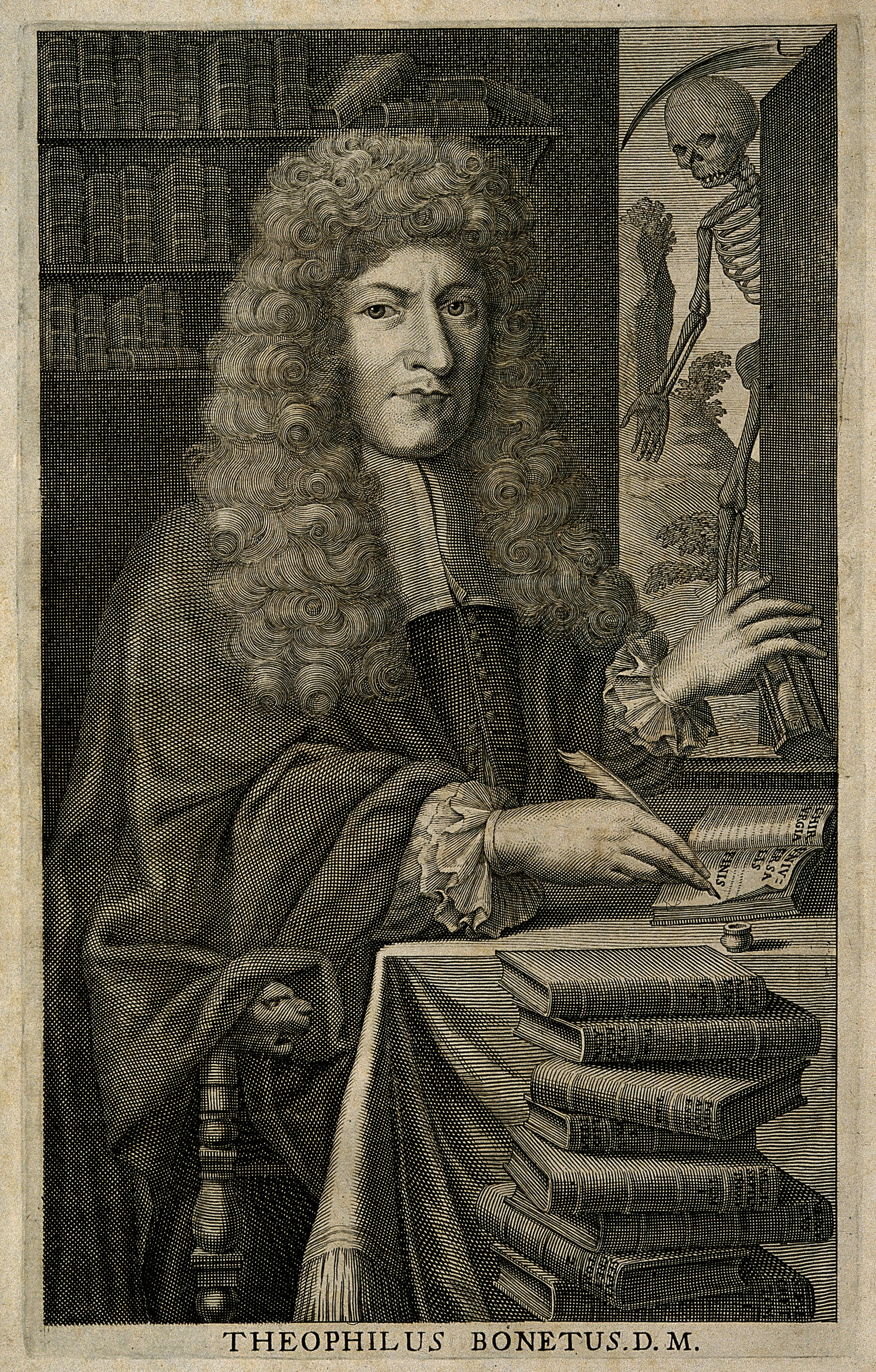
- Front piece Sepulchretum 1700
- Born: March 6, 1620; Geneva
- Died: March 29, 1689 (aged 69); Geneva
- Citizenship: Republic of Geneva
- Education: University of Bologna
- Known for: Pioneer of anatomical pathology
- Scientific career
- Fields: Medicine, anatomy

Théophile Bonet (March 6, 1620 – March 29, 1689) was a Swiss physician and anatomist who is considered one of the founders of anatomical pathology.

== Biography ==
Bonet was born into a family of physicians who were Italian protestant refugees who had immigrated to Geneva in 16th century during the Counter-Reformation. He attended various educational institutions, graduated in 1643 from the University of Bologna, becoming a doctor at the age of twenty-three. Bonet returned to Geneva, and built a practice through family connections. In 1652 he was admitted to the Geneva's Council of Two Hundred governing body. He later immigrated to Neuchâtel in 1657 because of the city’s doctor shortage, and was welcomed there with high honors. A year later he was appointed personal court physician to the reigning Neuchâtel Prince Henri II and was and granted a considerable salary. Bonet left Neuchâtel in 1666, and returned to Geneva due to hostility from local elite, after being assaulted by a local doctor and an apothecary because of his attempt to introduce new medical regulations in the region. At the age of fifty he developed serious health problems, including hearing loss that turned into complete deafness, and dropsy caused by heart disease. Because of his mounting health issues, he abandoned his medical practice and devoted all of his physical energy into his medical research. His Principal Work, the Sepulchretum is considered the first complete work on pathological anatomy. The Sepulchretum is 1,700 pages long and complies the details of three thousand autopsies carried about by himself and other authors like William Harvey, along with medical histories, dissection findings and commentaries, including the 1635 autopsy carried out by Harvey on the body of Thomas Parr who controversially claimed to be at 152 years at his death.Sepulchretum had a significant impact on creating the field of pathological anatomy and paved the groundwork for Giovanni Battista Morgagni a century later. He also wrote the popular Guide to the Practical Physician which was a widely translated practical guide to doctors, giving known treatments to common maladies such as hernia, fevers, tumors, fractures, and gout. He died suddenly of dropsy on March 29, 1689.

== Works ==
- Pharos Medicorum, Geneva, 1668. Bonet's commentary on other physicians and their mistakes he perceived
- Prodromus anatomiae practicae, sive de abditis morborum causis, ex cadaverum dissectione revelatis, libri primi, pars prima, de dolor ibus capitis ex illius apertione manifestis, Geneva, Francisci Miege. 1675. Considered to be a forerunner to the Sepulchretum
- Northern Medicine Medicina Medicina Septentr titia. Theophili Boneti, D. M., Genevae, Leonardi Chovët & Socii, 1684,
- Sepulchretum : sive anatomia practica, ex cadaveribus morbo denatis, proponens historias et observationes omnium humani corporis affectuum, ipsorumque causas reconditas revelans Gennva 1679 later published in 3 volumes is considered his most important work
- Mercurius compitalitius sive Index Medico-Practicus, Theophili Boneti, D. M. Genevae, Leonardi Chovet, & Socii, 1683, Translated into English as Guide to the Practical Physician, London 1684
