= Autopsy =

Medical examination of a corpse

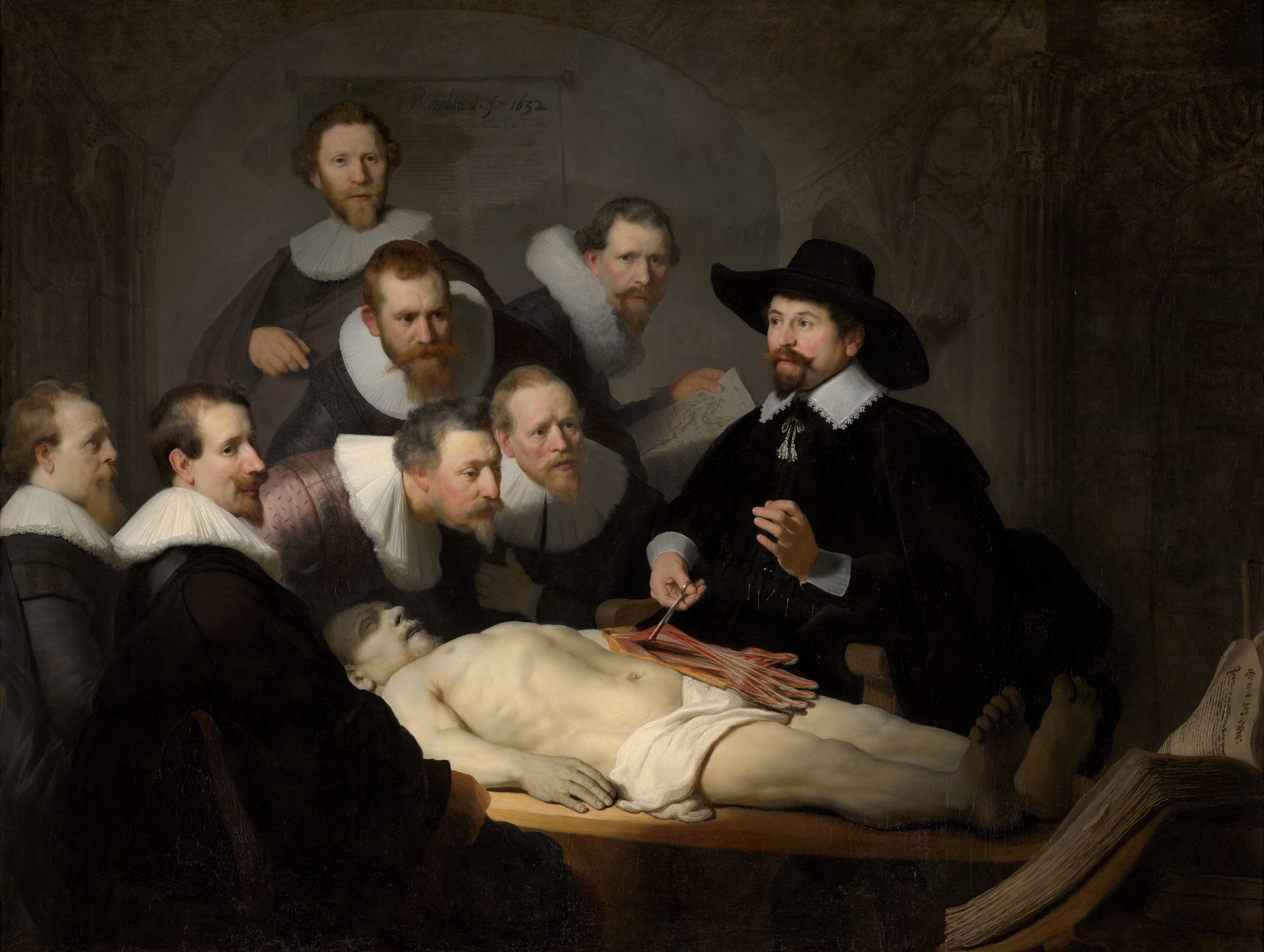
- The Anatomy Lesson of Dr. Nicolaes Tulp, (1632) by Rembrandt, depicts an autopsy.
- Specialty: Forensic pathology
- ICD-9-CM: 89.8
- MeSH: D001344

An autopsy (also referred to as post-mortem examination, obduction, necropsy, (Note: The terms autopsy or obduction are typically usually for human bodies, whereas the term necropsy is used for non-human bodies. Post-mortem may be used for both.) or autopsia cadaverum) is a surgical procedure that consists of a thorough examination of a corpse by dissection to determine the cause, mode, and manner of death; or the exam may be performed to evaluate any disease or injury that may be present for research or educational purposes. The term necropsy is generally used for non-human animals.

Autopsies are usually performed by a specialized medical doctor called a pathologist. Only a small portion of deaths require an autopsy to be performed, under certain circumstances. In most cases, a medical examiner or coroner can determine the cause of death.

Autopsies may be performed for legal, medical, educational, or research purposes. Forensic autopsies are used to establish the cause and manner of death and may also help identify the deceased, while clinical autopsies investigate disease and clarify or confirm diagnoses made before death. Academic autopsies are conducted for anatomical study, and some examinations use medical imaging rather than dissection.

== Etymology ==
=== Autopsy ===
The term "autopsy" derives from the Ancient Greek αὐτοψία autopsia, "to see for oneself", derived from αὐτός (autos, "oneself") and ὄψις (opsis, "sight, view"). The word has been in use since around the 17th century.

=== Post-mortem ===
The term "post-mortem" derives from the Latin post, 'after', and mortem, 'death'. It was first recorded in 1734.

=== Necropsy ===
The term "necropsy" is derived from the Greek νεκρός (nekrós, "dead") and ὄψις (opsis, 'sight, view').

== Purpose ==
The principal aims of an autopsy are to determine the cause of death, mode of death, manner of death, the state of health of the person before they died, and whether any medical diagnosis and treatment before death were appropriate. In most Western countries the number of autopsies performed in hospitals has been decreasing every year since 1955. Critics, including pathologist and former JAMA editor George D. Lundberg, have charged that the reduction in autopsies is negatively affecting the care delivered in hospitals, because when mistakes result in death, they are often not investigated and lessons, therefore, remain unlearned. When a person has permitted an autopsy in advance of their death, autopsies may also be carried out for the purposes of teaching or medical research. An autopsy is usually performed in cases of sudden death, where a doctor is not able to write a death certificate, or when death is believed to result from an unnatural cause. These examinations are performed under a legal authority (medical examiner, coroner, or procurator fiscal) and do not require the consent of relatives of the deceased. The most extreme example is the examination of murder victims, especially when medical examiners are looking for signs of death or the murder method, such as bullet wounds and exit points, signs of strangulation, or traces of poison. Some religions, including Judaism and Islam, usually discourage the performing of autopsies on their adherents. Organizations such as ZAKA in Israel and Misaskim in the United States generally guide families on how to ensure that an unnecessary autopsy is not made. Autopsies are used in clinical medicine to identify a medical error or a previously unnoticed condition that may endanger the living, such as infectious diseases or exposure to hazardous materials. A study that focused on myocardial infarction (heart attack) as a cause of death found significant errors of omission and commission, i.e. a sizable number of cases ascribed to myocardial infarctions (MIs) were not MIs and a significant number of non-MIs were MIs.

A systematic review of studies of the autopsy calculated that in about 25% of autopsies, a major diagnostic error will be revealed. However, this rate has decreased over time and the study projects that in a contemporary US institution, 8.4–24.4% of autopsies will detect major diagnostic errors.

A large meta-analysis suggested that approximately one-third of death certificates are incorrect and that half of the autopsies performed produced findings that were not suspected before the person died. Also, it is thought that over one-fifth of unexpected findings can only be diagnosed histologically, i.e., by biopsy or autopsy, and that approximately one-quarter of unexpected findings, or 5% of all findings, are major and can similarly only be diagnosed from tissue.

One study found that (out of 694 diagnoses) "Autopsies revealed 171 missed diagnoses, including 21 cancers, 12 strokes, 11 myocardial infarctions, 10 pulmonary emboli, and 9 endocarditis, among others".

Focusing on intubated patients, one study found "abdominal pathologic conditions – abscesses, bowel perforations, or infarction – were as frequent as pulmonary emboli as a cause of class I errors. While patients with abdominal pathologic conditions generally complained of abdominal pain, results of an examination of the abdomen were considered unremarkable in most patients, and the symptom was not pursued".

== Types ==
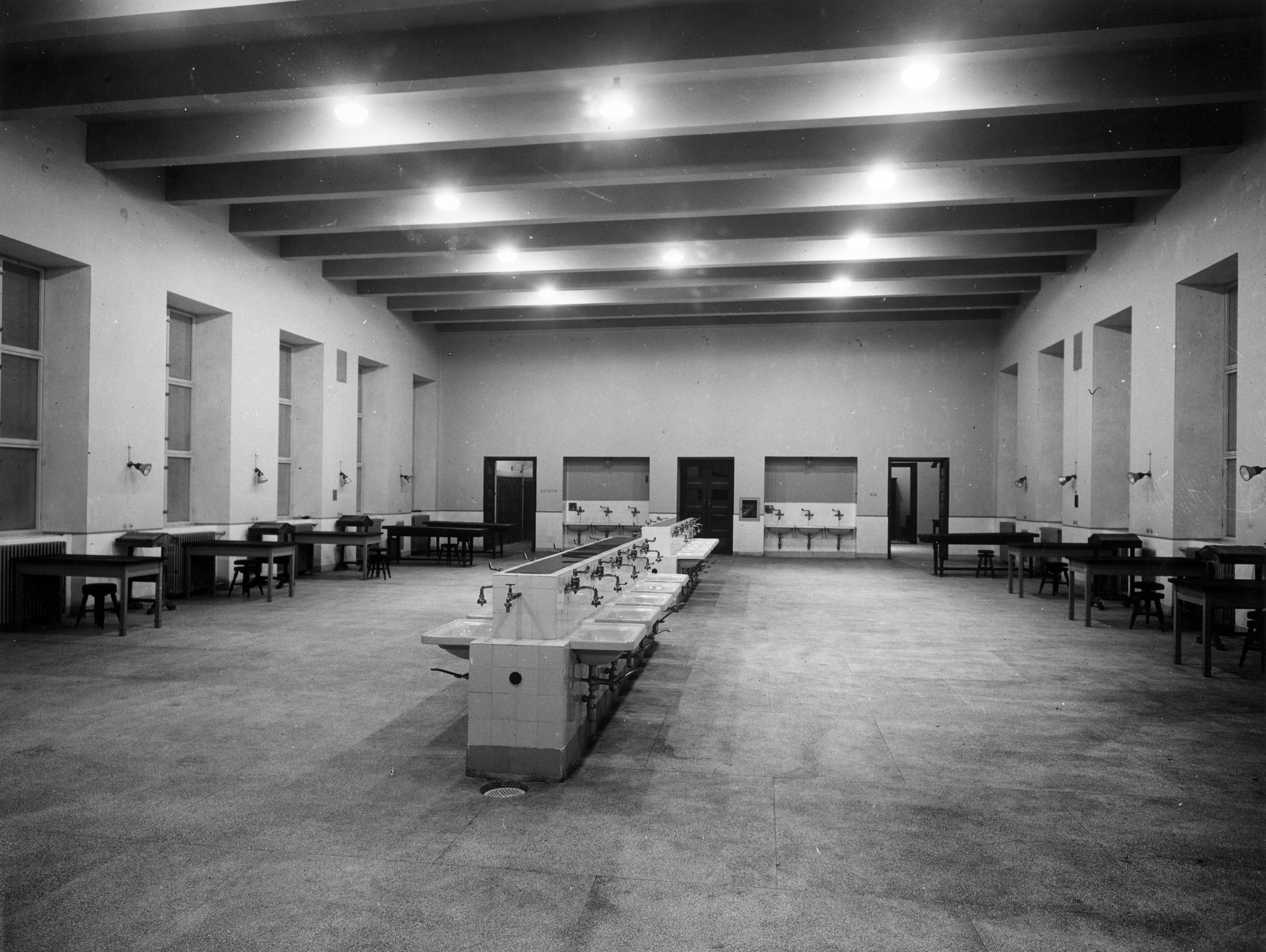
Dissection room at the University of Helsinki in Finland in 1928

There are four main types of autopsy:

- Medico-legal or forensic or coroner's autopsies seek to find the cause and manner of death and to identify the decedent. They are generally performed, as prescribed by applicable law, in cases of violent, suspicious or sudden deaths, deaths without medical assistance, or during surgical procedures.
- Clinical or pathological autopsies are performed to diagnose a particular disease or for research purposes. They aim to determine, clarify, or confirm medical diagnoses that remained unknown or unclear before the patient's death.
- Anatomical or academic autopsies are performed by students of anatomy for study purposes only.
- Virtual or medical imaging autopsies are performed utilizing imaging technology only, primarily magnetic resonance imaging (MRI) and computed tomography (CT).

=== Forensic autopsy ===
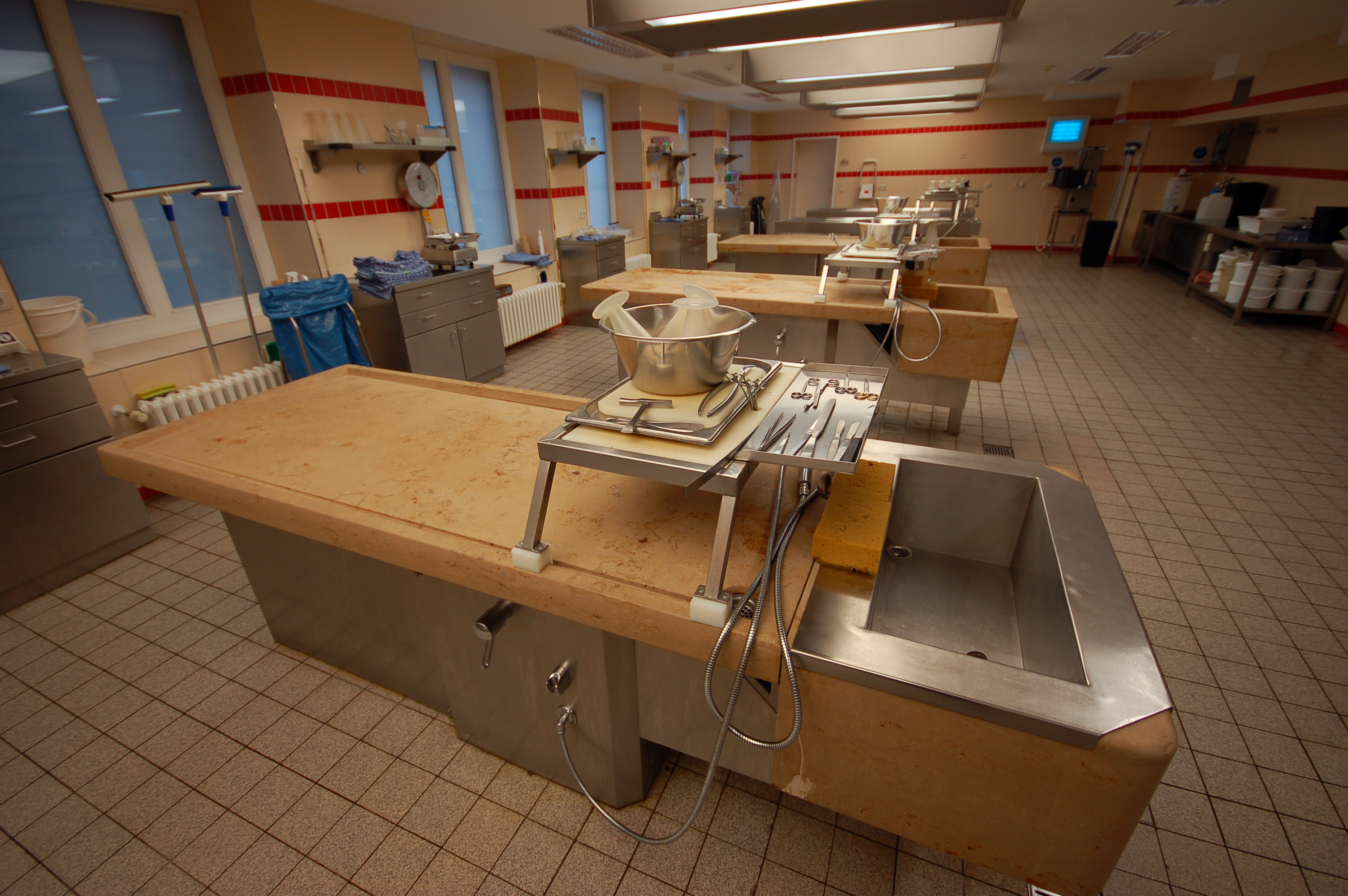
Autopsy room of the Charité Berlin, Germany, 2010

A forensic autopsy is used to determine the cause, mode, and manner of death.

Forensic science involves the application of the sciences to answer questions of interest to the legal system.

Medical examiners attempt to determine the time of death, the exact cause of death, and what, if anything, preceded the death, such as a struggle. A forensic autopsy may include obtaining biological specimens from the deceased for toxicological testing, including stomach contents. Toxicology tests may reveal the presence of one or more chemical "poisons" (all chemicals, in sufficient quantities, can be classified as a poison) and their quantity. Because post-mortem deterioration of the body, together with the gravitational pooling of bodily fluids, will necessarily alter the bodily environment, toxicology tests may overestimate, rather than underestimate, the quantity of the suspected chemical.

Following an in-depth examination of all the evidence, a medical examiner or coroner will assign a manner of death from the choices proscribed by the fact-finder's jurisdiction and will detail the evidence on the mechanism of the death.

=== Clinical autopsy ===
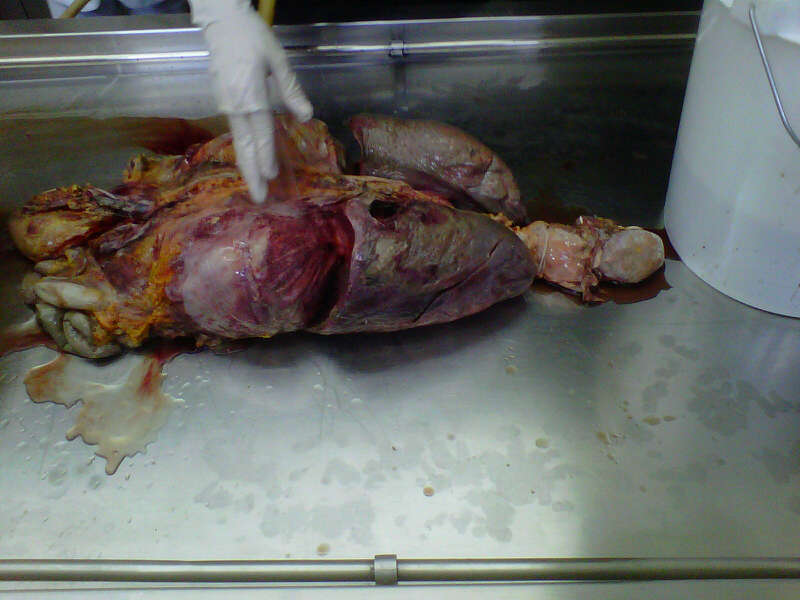
Pathologist performing a human dissection of the abdominal and thoracic organs in an autopsy room

Clinical autopsies serve two major purposes. They are performed to gain more insight into pathological processes and determine what factors contributed to a patient's death. For example, material for infectious disease testing can be collected during an autopsy. Autopsies are also performed to ensure the standard of care at hospitals. Autopsies can yield insight into how patient deaths can be prevented in the future.

Within the United Kingdom, clinical autopsies can be carried out only with the consent of the family of the deceased person, as opposed to a medico-legal autopsy instructed by a Coroner (England & Wales) or Procurator Fiscal (Scotland), to which the family cannot object.

Over time, autopsies have not only been able to determine the cause of death, but have also led to discoveries of various diseases such as fetal alcohol syndrome, Legionnaire's disease, and even viral hepatitis.

=== Academic autopsy ===
Academic autopsies are performed by students of anatomy for the purpose of study, giving medical students and residents firsthand experience viewing anatomy and pathology. Postmortem examinations require the skill to connect anatomic and clinical pathology together since they involve organ systems and interruptions from ante-mortem and post-mortem. These academic autopsies allow for students to practice and develop skills in pathology and become meticulous in later case examinations.

=== Virtual autopsy ===
Virtual autopsies are performed using radiographic techniques which can be used in post-mortem examinations for a deceased individual. It is an alternative to medical autopsies, where radiographs are used, for example, magnetic resonance imaging (MRI) and computed tomography (CT scan) which produce radiographic images in order to determine the cause of death, the nature, and the manner of death, without dissecting the deceased. It can also be used in the identification of the deceased. This method is helpful in determining the questions pertaining to an autopsy without putting the examiner at risk of biohazardous materials that can be in an individual's body.

== Prevalence ==
In 2004 in England and Wales, there were 514,000 deaths, of which 225,500 were referred to the coroner. Of those, 115,800 (22.5% of all deaths) resulted in post-mortem examinations and there were 28,300 inquests, 570 with a jury.

The rate of consented (hospital) autopsy in the UK and worldwide has declined rapidly over the past 50 years. In the UK in 2013, only 0.7% of inpatient adult deaths were followed by consented autopsy.

The autopsy rate in Germany is below 5% and thus much lower than in other countries in Europe. The governmental reimbursement is hardly sufficient to cover all the costs, so the medical journal Deutsches Ärzteblatt, issued by the German Medical Association, makes the effort to raise awareness regarding the underfinancing of autopsies. The same sources stated that autopsy rates in Sweden and Finland reach 20–30%.

In the United States, autopsy rates fell from 17% in 1980 to 14% in 1985 and 11.5% in 1989, although the figures vary notably from county to county.

== Process ==
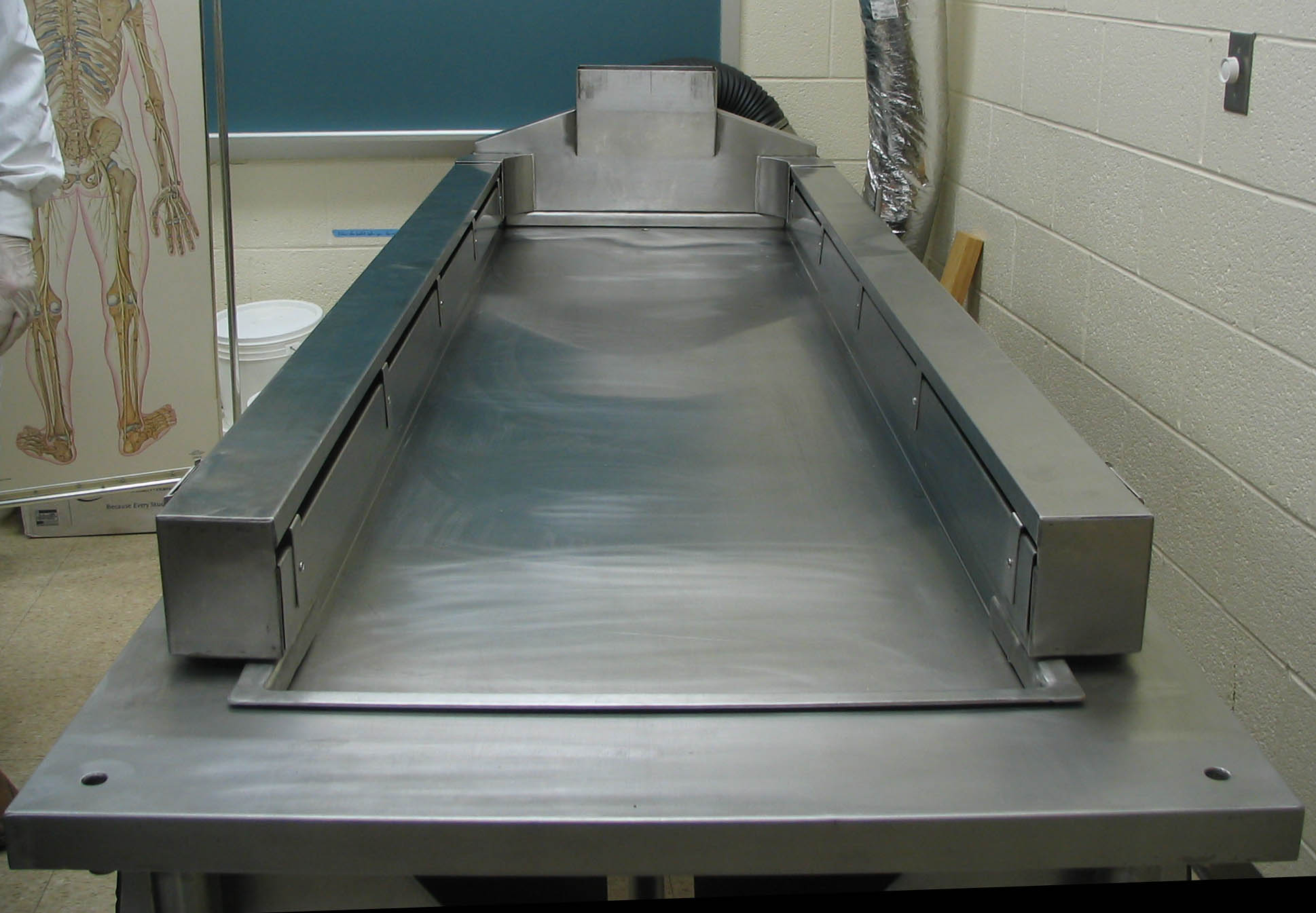
Cadaver dissection tables are similar to those used in medical or forensic autopsies.

The body is received at a medical examiner's office, municipal mortuary, or hospital in a body bag or evidence sheet. A new body bag is used for each body to ensure that only evidence from that body is contained within the bag. Evidence sheets are an alternative way to transport the body. An evidence sheet is a sterile sheet that covers the body when it is moved. If it is believed there may be any significant evidence on the hands, for example, gunshot residue or skin under the fingernails, a separate paper sack is put around each hand and taped shut around the wrist.

There are two parts to the physical examination of the body: the external and internal examination. Toxicology, biochemical tests or genetic testing/molecular autopsy often supplement these and frequently assist the pathologist in assigning the cause or causes of death.

=== External examination ===
At many institutions, the person responsible for handling, cleaning, and moving the body is called a diener, the German word for servant. In the UK this role is performed by an Anatomical Pathology Technician (APT), who will also assist the pathologist in eviscerating the body and reconstruction after the autopsy. After the body is received, it is first photographed. The examiner then notes the kind of clothes – if any – and their position on the body before they are removed. Next, any evidence such as residue, flakes of paint, or other material is collected from the external surfaces of the body. Ultraviolet light may also be used to search body surfaces for any evidence not easily visible to the naked eye. Samples of hair, nails, and the like are taken, and the body may also be radiographically imaged. Once the external evidence is collected, the body is removed from the bag, undressed, and any wounds present are examined. The body is then cleaned, weighed, and measured in preparation for the internal examination.

A general description of the body as regards ethnic group, sex, age, hair colour and length, eye colour, and other distinguishing features (birthmarks, old scar tissue, moles, tattoos, etc.) is then made. A voice recorder or a standard examination form is normally used to record this information.

In some countries, e.g., Scotland, France, Germany, Russia, and Canada, an autopsy may comprise an external examination only. This concept is sometimes termed a "view and grant". The principle behind this is that the medical records, history of the deceased and circumstances of death have all indicated as to the cause and manner of death without the need for an internal examination.

=== Internal examination ===
If not already in place, a plastic or rubber brick called a "head block" is placed under the shoulders of the corpse; hyperflexion of the neck makes the spine arch backward while stretching and pushing the chest upward to make it easier to incise. This gives the APT, or pathologist, maximum exposure to the trunk. After this is done, the internal examination begins. The internal examination consists of inspecting the internal organs of the body by dissection for evidence of trauma or other indications of the cause of death. For the internal examination there are a number of different approaches available:

- a large and deep Y-shaped incision can be made starting at the top of each shoulder and running down the front of the chest, meeting at the lower point of the sternum (breastbone).
- a curved incision made from the tips of each shoulder, in a semi-circular line across the chest/decolletage, to approximately the level of the second rib, curving back up to the opposite shoulder.
- a single vertical incision is made from the sternal notch at the base of the neck.
- a U-shaped incision is made at the tip of both shoulders, down along the side of the chest to the bottom of the rib cage, following it. This is typically used on women and during chest-only autopsies.

There is no need for any incision to be made, which will be visible after completion of the examination when the deceased is dressed in a shroud. In all of the above cases, the incision then extends all the way down to the pubic bone (making a deviation to either side of the navel) and avoiding, where possible, transecting any scars that may be present.

Bleeding from the cuts is minimal, or non-existent because the pull of gravity is producing the only blood pressure at this point, related directly to the complete lack of cardiac functionality. However, in certain cases, there is anecdotal evidence that bleeding can be quite profuse, especially in cases of drowning.

At this point, shears are used to open the chest cavity. The examiner uses the tool to cut through the ribs on the costal cartilage, to allow the sternum to be removed; this is done so that the heart and lungs can be seen in situ and that the heart – in particular, the pericardial sac – is not damaged or disturbed from opening. A PM 40 knife is used to remove the sternum from the soft tissue that attaches it to the mediastinum. Now the lungs and the heart are exposed. The sternum is set aside and will eventually be replaced at the end of the autopsy.

At this stage, the organs are exposed. Usually, the organs are removed in a systematic fashion. Making a decision as to what order the organs are to be removed will depend highly on the case in question. Organs can be removed in several ways: The first is the en masse technique of Letulle whereby all the organs are removed as one large mass. The second is the en bloc method of Ghon. The most popular in the UK is a modified version of this method, which is divided into four groups of organs. Although these are the two predominant evisceration techniques, in the UK variations on these are widespread.

One method is described here: The pericardial sac is opened to view the heart. Blood for chemical analysis may be removed from the inferior vena cava or the pulmonary veins. Before removing the heart, the pulmonary artery is opened in order to search for a blood clot. The heart can then be removed by cutting the inferior vena cava, the pulmonary veins, the aorta and pulmonary artery, and the superior vena cava. This method leaves the aortic arch intact, which will make things easier for the embalmer. The left lung is then easily accessible and can be removed by cutting the bronchus, artery, and vein at the hilum. The right lung can then be similarly removed. The abdominal organs can be removed one by one after first examining their relationships and vessels.

Most pathologists, however, prefer the organs to be removed all in one "block". Using dissection of the fascia, blunt dissection; using the fingers or hands and traction; the organs are dissected out in one piece for further inspection and sampling. During autopsies of infants, this method is used almost all of the time. The various organs are examined, weighed and tissue samples in the form of slices are taken. Even major blood vessels are cut open and inspected at this stage. Next, the stomach and intestinal contents are examined and weighed. This could be useful to find the cause and time of death, due to the natural passage of food through the bowel during digestion. The more area empty, the longer the deceased had gone without a meal before death.

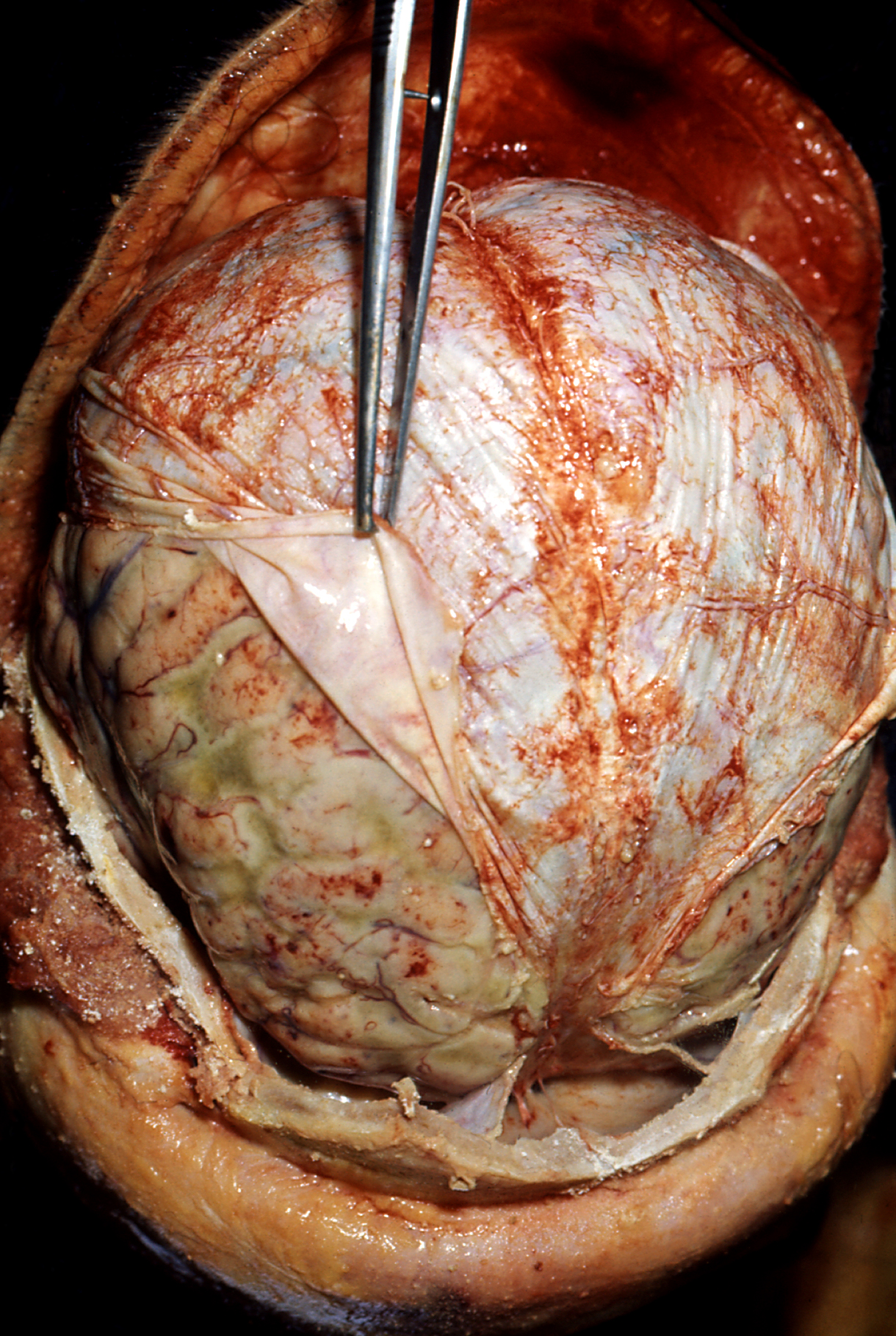
A brain autopsy demonstrating signs of meningitis. The forceps (center) are retracting the dura mater (white). Underneath the dura mater are the leptomeninges, which appear to be edematous and have multiple small hemorrhagic foci.

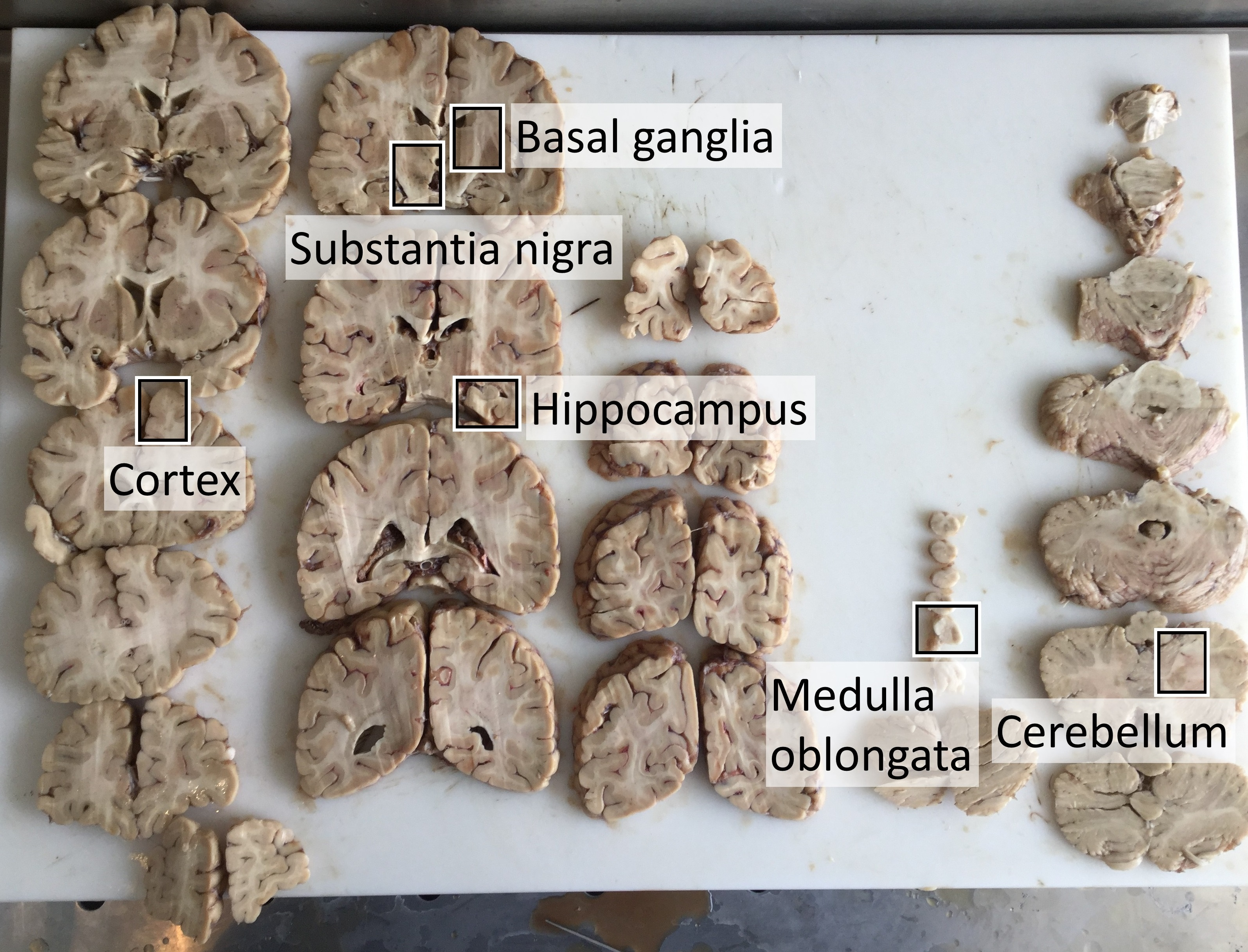
Autopsy of a brain after sectioning, showing a normal brain with the cerebrum cut in coronal sections, and the cerebellum, pons and medulla cut in horizontal sections. Standard sections for microscopic examination are annotated.

The body block that was used earlier to elevate the chest cavity is now used to elevate the head. To examine the brain, an incision is made from behind one ear, over the crown of the head, to a point behind the other ear. When the autopsy is completed, the incision can be neatly sewn up and is not noticed when the head is resting on a pillow in an open casket funeral. The scalp is pulled away from the skull in two flaps with the front flap going over the face and the rear flap over the back of the neck. The skull is then cut with a circular (or semicircular) bladed reciprocating saw to create a "cap" that can be pulled off, exposing the brain. The brain is then observed in situ. Then the brain's connections to the cranial nerves and spinal cord are severed, and the brain is lifted out of the skull for further examination. If the brain needs to be preserved before being inspected, it is contained in a large container of formalin (15 percent solution of formaldehyde gas in buffered water) for at least two, but preferably four weeks. This not only preserves the brain, but also makes it firmer, allowing easier handling without corrupting the tissue.

=== Reconstitution of the body ===
An important component of the autopsy is the reconstitution of the body such that it can be viewed, if desired, by relatives of the deceased following the procedure. After the examination, the body has an open and empty thoracic cavity with chest flaps open on both sides; the top of the skull is missing, and the skull flaps are pulled over the face and neck. It is unusual to examine the face, arms, hands or legs internally.

In the UK, following the Human Tissue Act 2004 all organs and tissue must be returned to the body unless permission is given by the family to retain any tissue for further investigation. Normally the internal body cavity is lined with cotton, wool, or a similar material, and the organs are then placed into a plastic bag to prevent leakage and are returned to the body cavity. The chest flaps are then closed and sewn back together and the skull cap is sewed back in place. Then the body may be wrapped in a shroud, and it is common for relatives to not be able to tell the procedure has been done when the body is viewed in a funeral parlor after embalming.

== In stroke ==
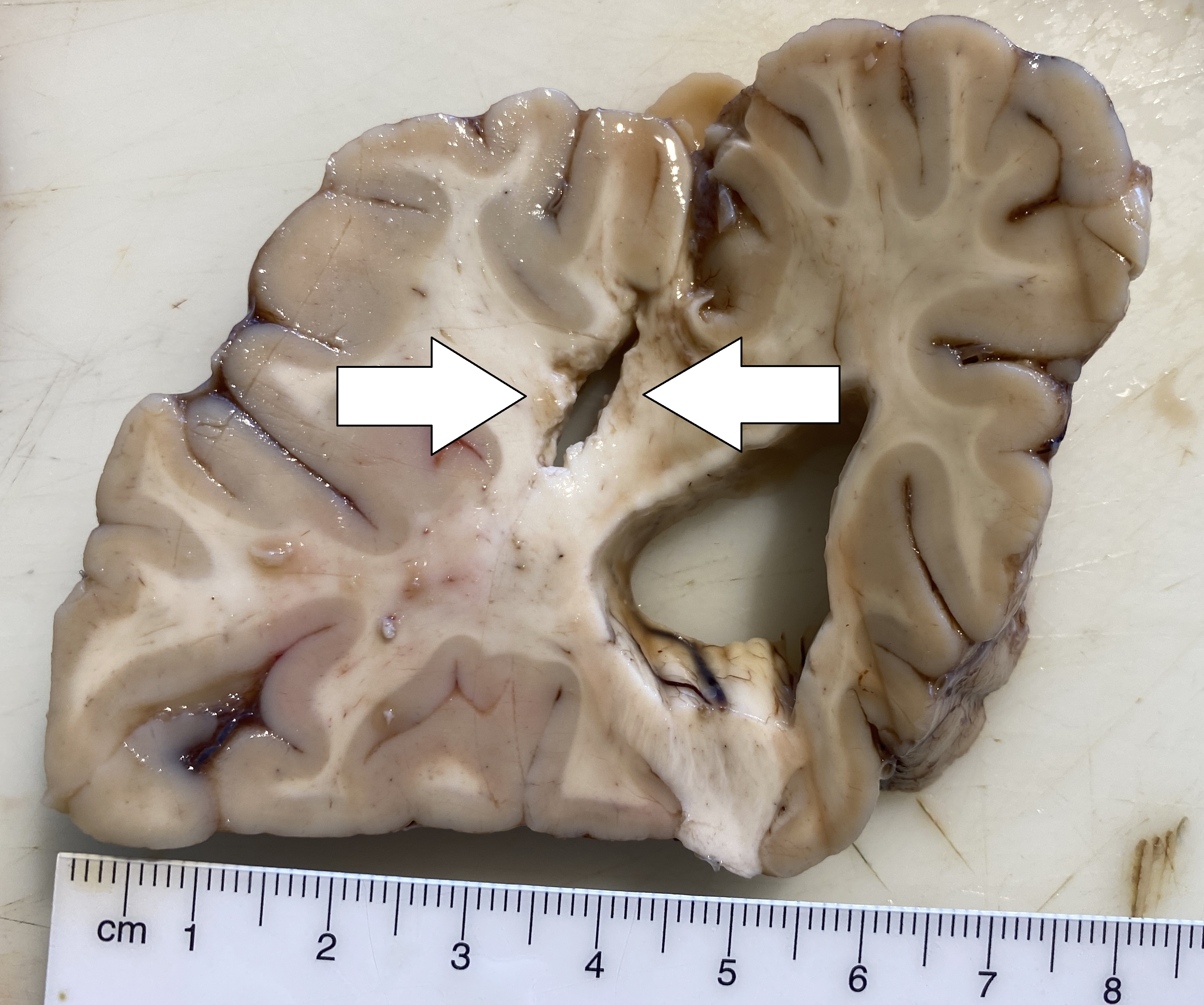
Cavitation at gross pathology of an old stroke in the left posterior parietal lobe

An autopsy of stroke may be able to establish the time taken from the onset of cerebral infarction to the time of death.

Various microscopic findings are present at times from infarction as follows:

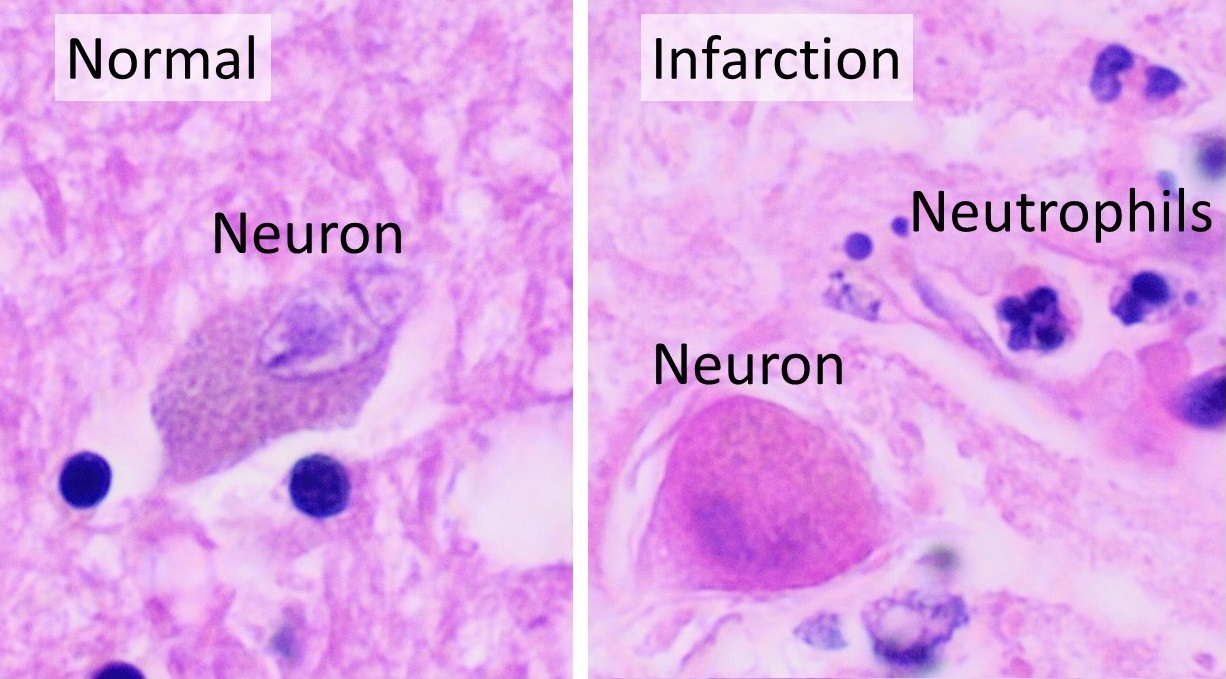
Histopathology at high magnification of a normal neuron, and an ischemic stroke at approximately 24 hours on H&E stain: The neurons become hypereosinophilic and there is an infiltrate of neutrophils. There is slight edema and loss of normal architecture in the surrounding neuropil.

Finding	Presence
Eosinophilic (red) neurons	1–35 days
Polymorphonuclear leukocytes	1–37 days
Other acute neuronal injuries	1–60 days
Coagulative necrosis	1 day – 5 years
Spongiosis of surrounding tissue	1 day and older
Astrogliosis (gemistocytes)	2 days and older
Neo-vascularization	3 days and older
Hemosiderin pigment	3 days and older
Mononuclear inflammatory cells	3 days–50 years
Macrophages	3 days–50 years
Cavitation	12 days or older

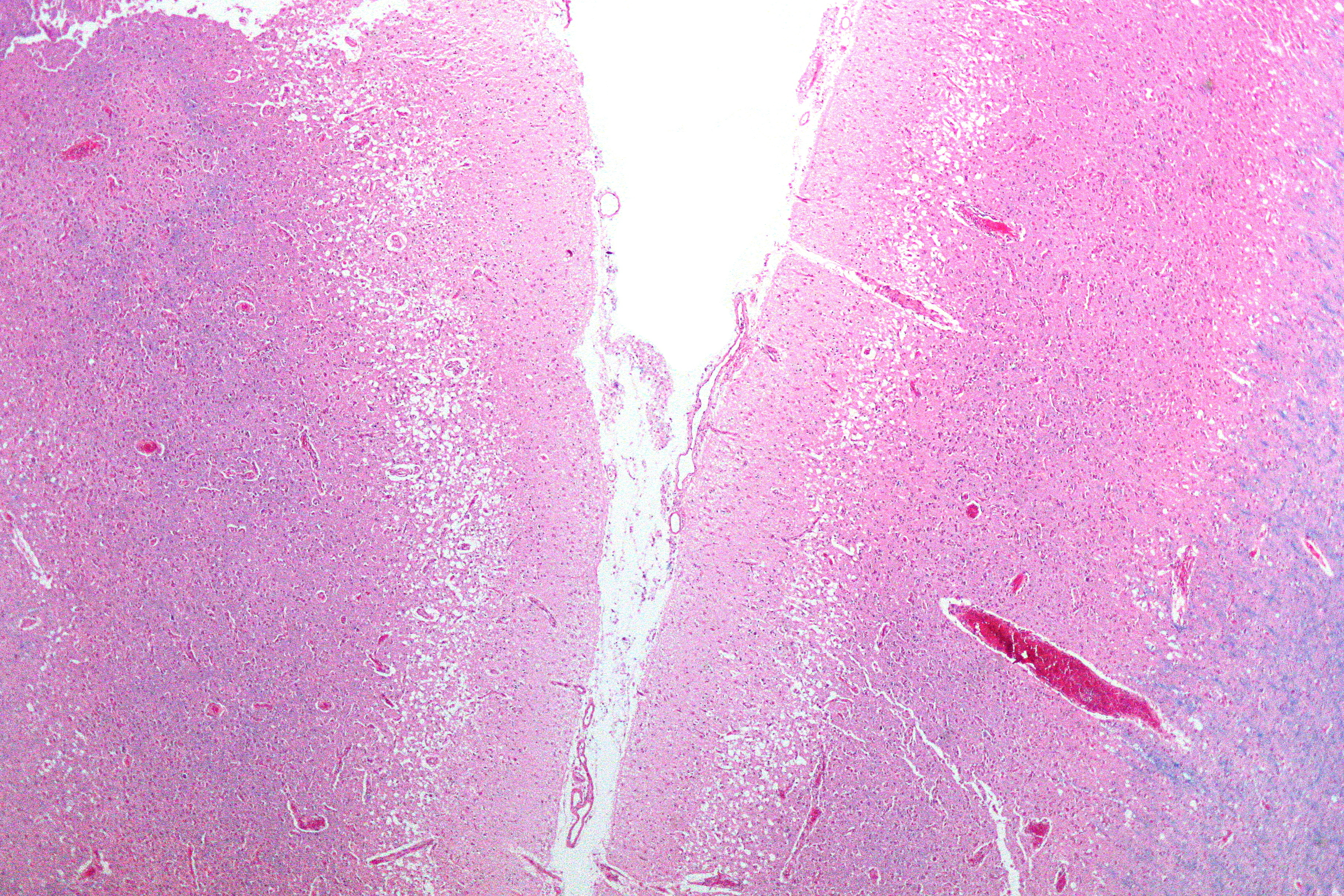
Micrograph showing cortical pseudolaminar necrosis, a finding seen in strokes on medical imaging and at autopsy. H&E-LFB stain.

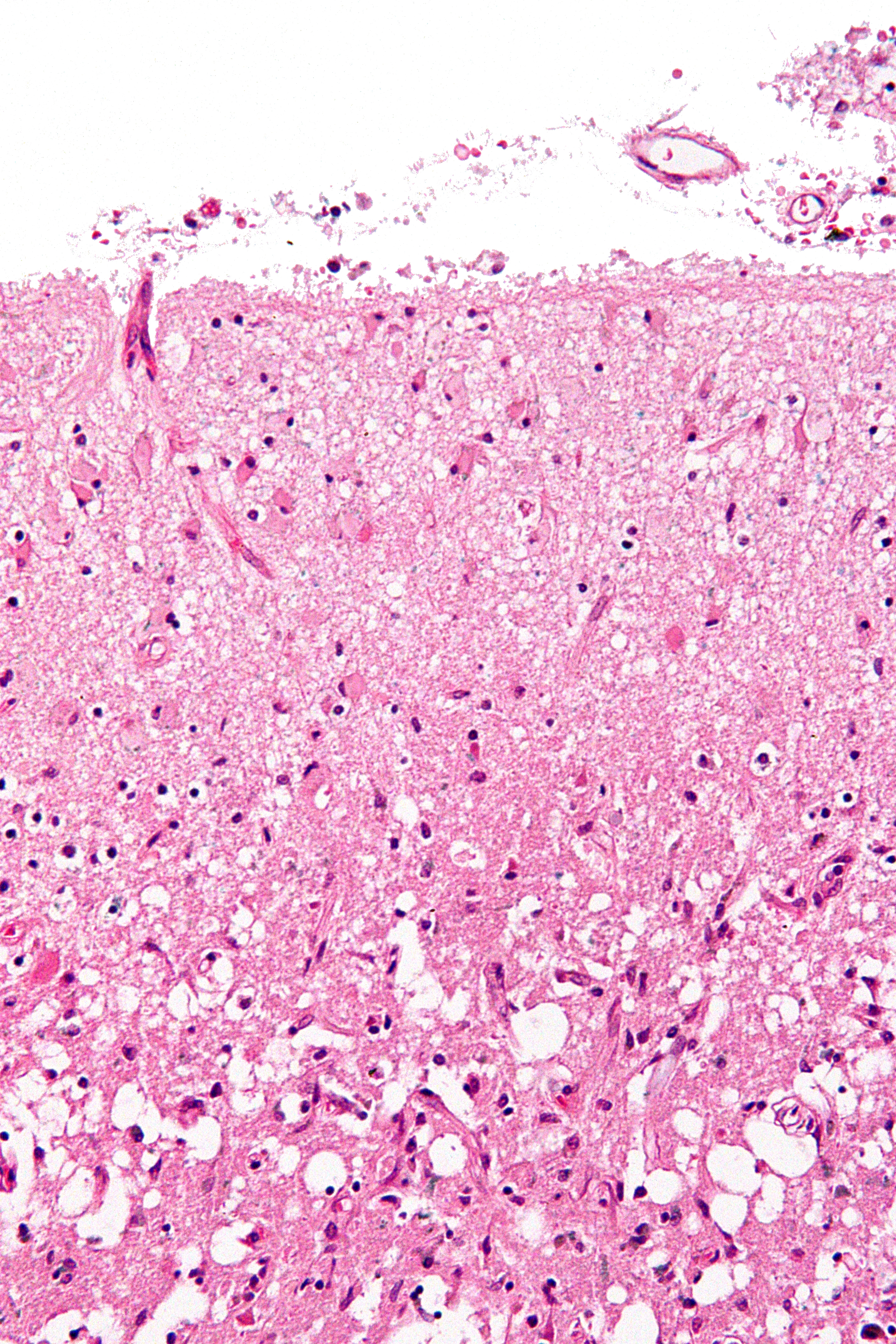
Micrograph of the superficial cerebral cortex showing neuron loss and reactive astrocytes in a person that has had a stroke. H&E-LFB stain.

== History ==
Throughout history, there have been three forms of autopsy: the anatomic autopsy, the clinical autopsy, and the forensic autopsy. The anatomic autopsy focuses on the function and structure of the body, whereas the clinical autopsy involves investigating the underlying causes and development of disease. Lastly, the forensic autopsy helps to determine the cause and manner of death, as well as assessing whether external violence contributed to it. Evidence of forensic autopsies dates back to at least the 13th century in Bologna, while the anatomic autopsy rose to significance in Padua before influencing other cities across Europe. In the 19th and early 20th centuries, clinical autopsy rose to popularity, becoming the main method of anatomical research.

Around 3000 BCE, ancient Egyptians were one of the first civilizations to practice the removal and examination of the internal organs of humans in the religious practice of mummification.

Autopsies that opened the body to determine the cause of death were attested to occur at least in the early third millennium BCE. However, opposition to autopsy existed in many ancient societies, due to the belief that the outward disfigurement of dead persons prevented them from entering the afterlife. This was the case in Egypt, where the organs were removed through tiny slits in the body. Notable Greek autopsists were Erasistratus and Herophilus of Chalcedon, who lived in 3rd century BCE Alexandria. In general, however, autopsies were rare in ancient Greece. In 44 BCE, Julius Caesar was the subject of an official autopsy after his murder by rival senators. The physician's report noted that the second stab wound Caesar received was the fatal one. By around 150 BCE, ancient Roman legal practice had established clear parameters for autopsies. One significant ancient anatomist was Galen (129 – c. 216 CE), who gained most of his anatomical knowledge from dissecting animals. His findings went largely unchallenged for over a thousand years, until the Renaissance.

The dissection of human remains for medical or scientific reasons continued to be practiced irregularly after the Romans, for instance by the Arab physicians Avenzoar and Ibn al-Nafis. In Europe they were done with enough regularity to become skilled, as early as 1200, and successful efforts to preserve the body, by filling the veins with wax and metals. Until the 20th century, it was thought that the modern autopsy process derived from the anatomists of the Renaissance.

Ibn Tufail (c. 1109/10-1185/86), a Moorish philosopher and physician amongst other things, elaborated on autopsy in his treatise called Hayy ibn Yaqzan and Nadia Maftouni, discussing the subject in an extensive article, believes him to be among the early supporters of autopsy and vivisection.

In addition to these early supporters, there were also key figures that directly opposed autopsy. Pope Boniface VIII (c. 1230-1303) was one of these individuals. He forbade the cooking of bodies to separate the flesh from bone, which had been a common practice to bring home people who had died fighting in the Crusades. Many interpreted this as meaning that any interference with human bodies, even for the purpose of study, was forbidden. This led to a hesitation among physicians to perform autopsies and a decline in anatomical research. In the late 15th century, Pope Sixtus IV issued a bull that permitted students at Bologna and Padua universities to dissect human bodies, representing the beginning of acceptance towards autopsy by the Catholic Church and paving the way for future anatomists such as Andreas Vesalius and Giovanni Battista Morgaani.

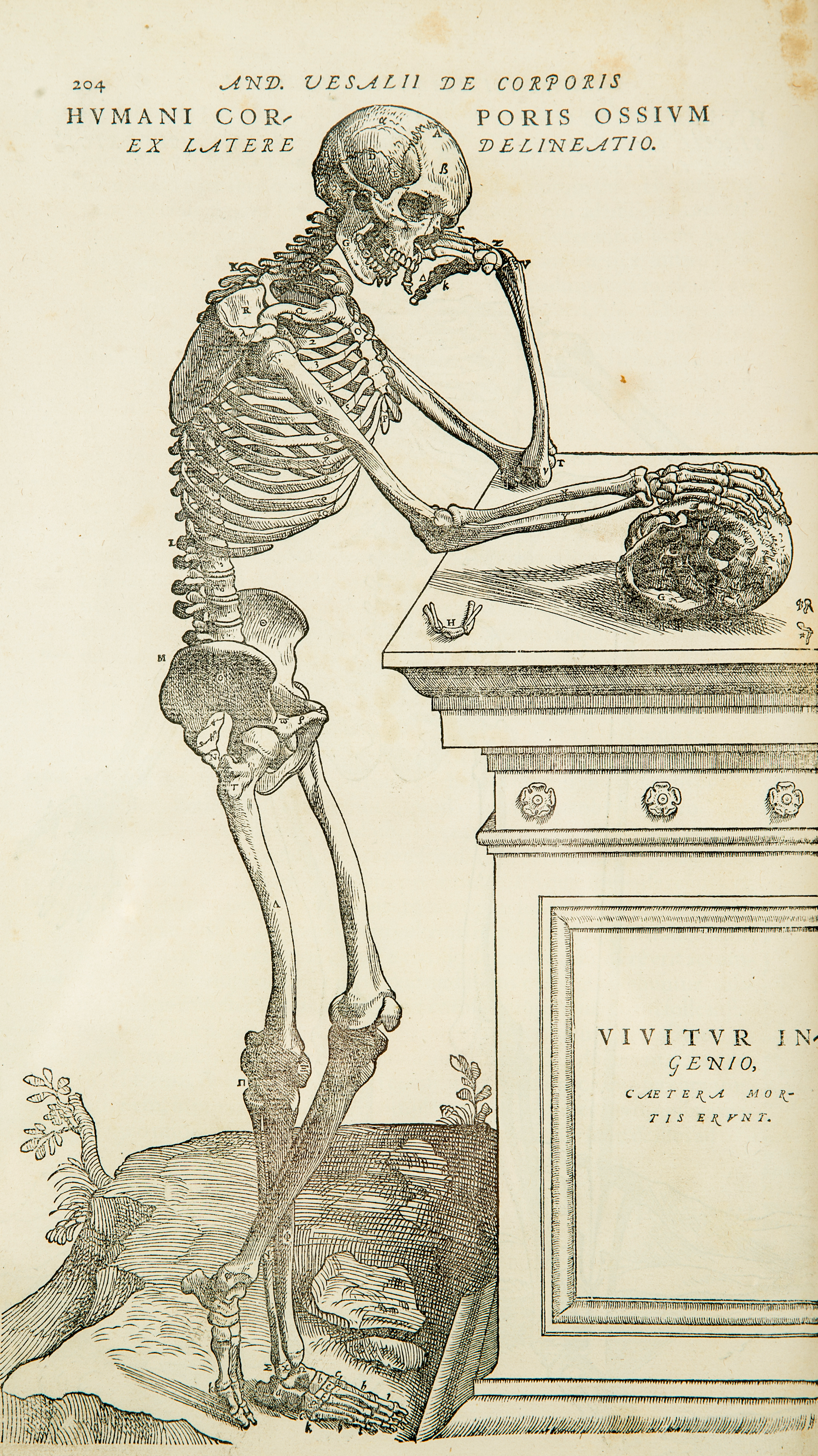
Lateral view of the human skeleton, page 164 of Andreas Vesalius' De corporis humani fabrica libri septem.

Andreas Vesalius (c. 1514-1564), a pioneering, Netherlands-born anatomist, helped advance the study of human anatomy mainly through anatomical autopsy, where he focused on the structure and function of the human body. In 1543, Vesalius conducted a public dissection of the body of a former criminal. He articulated the bones, creating what is considered the world's oldest surviving anatomical preparation. His famous text on human anatomy, De Humani Corporis Fabrica Libri Septum (1543), gained traction across Europe, becoming the foundational work of early modern anatomy and reshaping medical understanding of the structure of the human body, particularly the skeletal and muscular systems. In his work, Vesalius emphasized musculoskeletal system more thoroughly than his predecessors by including detailed, more accurate drawings of these structures. Through anatomical illustrations of skeletons contemplating their own deaths, Vesalius validated the human experience and cemented human anatomy as the centerpiece of 16th century investigations.

Giovanni Battista Morgagni (1682-1771), an Italian anatomist, performed clinical autopsies to study the mechanisms of disease, linking symptoms of living patients to physical changes in organs after death. His research marked a new understanding of pathology through clinical observation. Morgagni, who is celebrated as the father of anatomical pathology, wrote the first exhaustive work on pathology, De Sedibus et Causis Morborum per Anatomen Indagatis (The Seats and Causes of Diseases Investigated by Anatomy, 1769).

During Morgagni's lifetime, Theophile Bonet (1620-1689), a Swiss anatomist, published a work, the Sepulchretum in 1679. Nearly 450 authors, including Galen and Vesalius, were mentioned. The medical compilation included various examples of autopsies that had been performed, providing knowledge about anatomy and demonstrating the extent to which medical knowledge had been gathered up until this point.

In the mid-1800s, Carl von Rokitansky and colleagues at the Second Vienna Medical School began to undertake dissections as a means to improve diagnostic medicine.

In the 19th century, there was a general lack of standardization. Rudolf Virchow, in response to this inconsistency in autopsy procedures, established and published specific autopsy protocols (one such protocol still bears his name).

During the turn of the 20th century, people began to further develop forensic science. The Scotland Yard created the Office of the Forensic Pathologist, a medical examiner trained in medicine, charged with investigating the cause of all unnatural deaths, including accidents, homicides, suicides, etc.

== Other animals (necropsy) ==
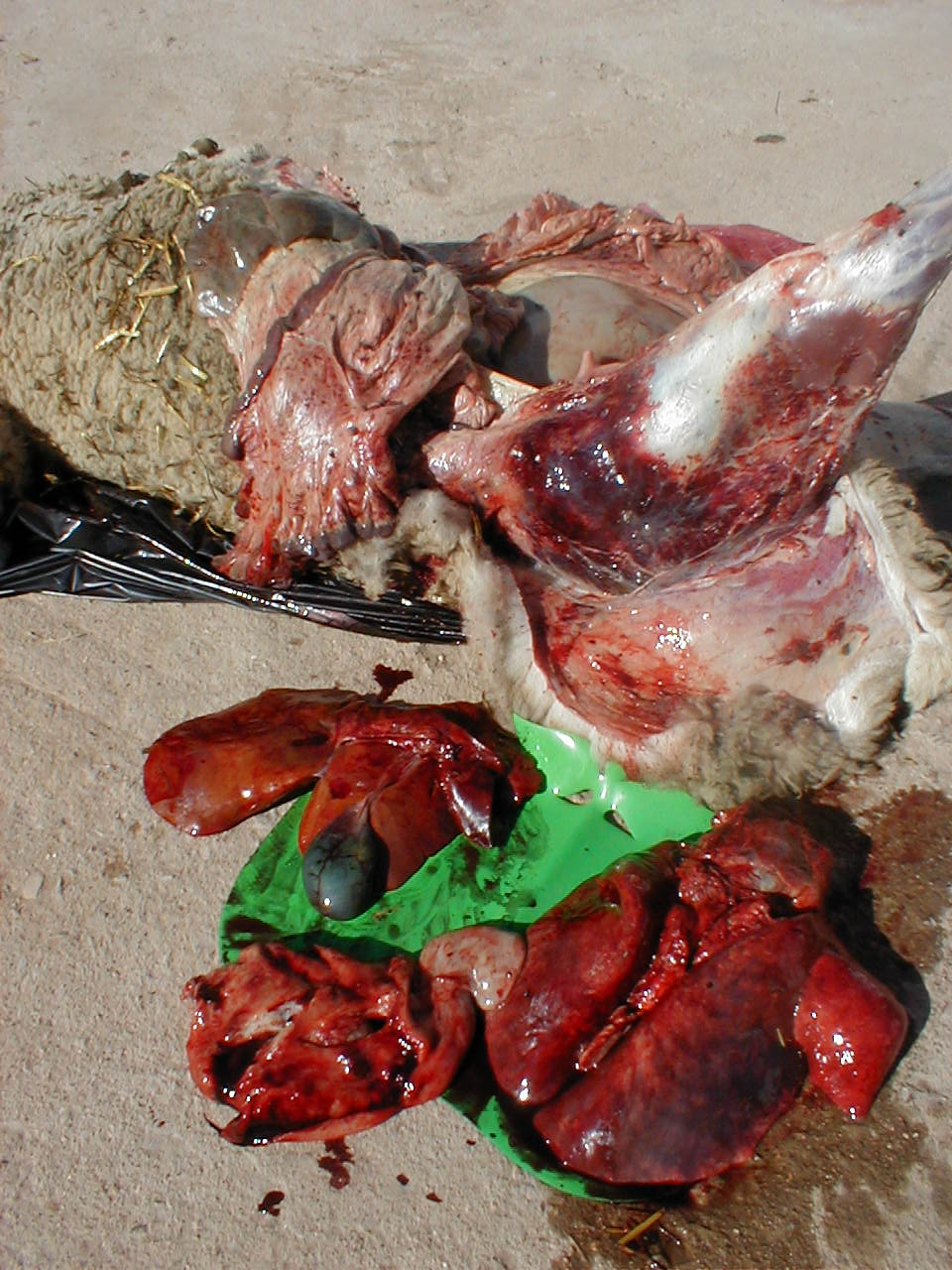
A field post-mortem exam of an ewe (female sheep)

A post-mortem examination in non-human animals is also called a necropsy. It is far more common in veterinary medicine than in human medicine. For many species that exhibit few external symptoms (sheep), or that are not suited to detailed clinical examination (poultry, cage birds, zoo animals), it is a common method used by veterinary physicians to come to a diagnosis. A necropsy is used to determine the cause of death. The entire body is examined at the gross visual level, and samples are collected for additional analyses.

== See also ==
- Body identification
- Digital autopsy
- Forensic anthropology
- Forensic facial reconstruction
- Forensic identification
- Murder book
- Virtopsy
- Vivisection
