= Virtopsy =

Radiological autopsy

Virtopsy is a virtual alternative to a traditional autopsy, conducted with scanning and imaging technology. The name is a portmanteau of "virtual" and "autopsy" and is a trademark registered to Richard Dirnhofer, the former head of the Institute of Forensic Medicine of the University of Bern, Switzerland.

Dirnhofer has proposed virtopsy as a partial or complete replacement for traditional autopsy, and he has asserted that virtopsy fully satisfies the requirement that medical forensic findings provide "a complete and true picture of the object examined". Furthermore, virtopsy is said to achieve the objective "that the pathologist's report should 'photograph' with words so that the reader is able to follow his thoughts visually".

== Concept ==
Virtopsy employs imaging methods that are also used in clinical medicine such as computed tomography (CT) scans and magnetic resonance imaging (MRI). Also, 3D body surface scanning is used to integrate body surface documentation with 3D scene or tool scans. The choice of methods is further supplemented with 3D imaging-guided biopsy systems and post-mortem angiography.

CT is well suited to show foreign objects, bone and air or gas distribution throughout the body, whereas MRI sequences are strong in detailing organ and soft tissue findings. A comprehensive analysis of both surface and deep tissue findings may require fusion of CT, MRI and 3D surface data.

Resulting data can be archived and reproduced without loss, analysed elsewhere, or distributed to specialists for technically demanding analysis.

Because traditional autopsies can produce both different and additional findings compared to virtopsies, virtopsy is not a generally accepted method to entirely replace autopsies. In fact, the first scientific study detailing the results of comparing postmortem CT scanning with conventional autopsies concluded that single methods were not as useful as the combination of scanning and autopsy were.

== Terms ==
The term "Virtobot" is a trademark also registered to Prof. R. Dirnhofer. It describes a multi-functional robotic system.

The "Virtangio" machine is a device that is trademarked to Prof. R. Dirnhofer and manufactured by Fumedica .

== Operative aspects ==
With Prof. Michael Thali as operative head of the group, the virtopsy research team has operated out of the Institute of Forensic Medicine at the University of Zurich, Switzerland since early 2011.

=== Examination of death ===
The idea to conduct virtual autopsy is not new. In 2003, the British Museum contacted the Institute of Forensic Medicine for their help performing a virtopsy on a 3000-year-old mummy named Nesperennub, as an autopsy could not be done without compromising the body. While manner of death, cause of death, time of death, identification of deceased and a range of practical and reconstructive applications are obviously related to medicolegal investigation of death, virtopsy methods were ground breaking in that they have established a new high-tech toolbox into both research and practice morphological investigation aspects of modern forensic pathology.

Since virtopsy is non-invasive, it can be less traumatic for surviving family members and may not violate religious taboos against violating bodily integrity.

=== Examination of the living ===
Non-invasive imaging is also conducted in living or surviving subjects, but as that has been the main clinical application of CT and MR imaging to begin with, their use in medicolegal investigation of the living is not as ground breaking as using them for investigation of death. Nevertheless, a number of applications that may be regarded as specific for medicolegal imaging applications in the living have found attraction for virtopsy-derived methods:

- Matching weapon or injury-causing agent and injury. The application of 3D surface documentation of injuries for the benefit of medicolegal reconstruction must be accredited to Brueschweiler et al. (2003).
- Strangulation and estimation of risk of death. The first paper documenting systematic application of MRI to survivors of strangulation for the benefit of forensic medicine was published by Yen et al. in 2005.
- Body packing. According to a paper of the virtopsy group, CT scanning may be more suitable to body packer identification than conventional or plain abdominal X-rays.

== Technology ==
The technology currently used for conducting a "virtual autopsy" comprises

- Robot-guided surface scanning for three-dimensional documentation of the surface of the body, to scale and in color, supplementing a visual inspection.
- Multislice spiral CT and MRI for visualising the body in 3D. This supplements the internal postmortem examination of the body in an autopsy.
- Post mortem angiography, which visualises the cardiovascular system of the deceased with the aid of a peristaltic pump and contrast medium.
- Image- and robot-guided sampling for supplementary forensic analyses, such as histology, bacteriology, virology, toxicology and diatomology.

== Virtopsy objectives ==
The virtopsy idea was generated to yield results along a comprehensive number of performance indicators:

- The practical objective of both research and application of virtopsy methods are to improve the objectivity of findings made in forensic autopsies.
- The academic objective of virtopsy research is to publish original and validation type research.
- Last but not the least, financial gains are also a relevant aspect of new technology particularly in the private industry sector whereas saving cost is an aspect for public institutes or offices.

== Advantages ==
This method offers the following advantages:

- Preservation of the body in a virtual form.
- Observer-independent documentation of the evidence – "delegation of seeing to the machine".
- Complete, non-destructive gathering of findings from head to toe
- Data acquisition in parts of the body that otherwise would not be examined out of respect for the deceased (e.g. the face).
- Data acquisition in regions that are difficult to dissect and access (e.g. atlanto-occipital joints), and in cases of advanced decomposition.
- Visualization of the cardiovascular system.
- Replacement of manual dexterity by the "virtual knife" of the automatic sectional imaging technique.
- Standardized data acquisition procedure.
- High-precision, contamination-free sampling (poisons, infections, tissue, etc.) accurate to the millimeter.
- True-to-scale 3D documentation for precise forensic reconstructions.
- Clean, bloodless visualization of the documentation.
- Improvement in the quality of forensic reports – simultaneous examination by different experts via tele-forensics.
- Simplification of the assessment of evidence by improved comprehensibility of the visual 3D findings.
- Acceptance by relatives and religious communities over conventional autopsies.
- The complete saved data-set can be re-examined at any time if a second expert opinion is required, even after burial or cremation of the body.
- Rapid and complete data acquisition as part of analyses following disasters (terrorist attacks, plane crashes, etc.).

== Disadvantages ==
- High equipment costs
- The limitations for radiology apply:
  - Metal foreign objects
  - One cannot determine the color of internal organs and color changes
  - One cannot determine all the pathological conditions (e.g. inflammation)
  - One cannot determine the infection status of tissue
  - It is difficult to differentiate antemortem from postmortem wounds and postmortem artifacts
  - Small tissue injuries may be overlooked
- The limitations for surface scanning apply:
  - Recording concave features, out of view
  - Turning the body over for total body recording can alter the body shape due to gravity (e.g. stomach) which may disturb the merging of recorded surfaces
  - Recording reflective or transparent surfaces (e.g. the eye)
- Merging data from multiple techniques will always result in some loss of precision
- A reliance on imagery alone may lead to omissions (e.g. bruising under the scalp not visible with surface scanning)
- Validity
  - No proper validation of the method has been made using closely prepared prospective studies
  - No error rate available
  - No juridical validity (yet)
  - As applicable to all simulated evidence presented in the court room, there are concerns of suggestiveness
- Objectivity
  - It has not been investigated whether experts are consistent in their judgment
  - Context effects (e.g. post-hoc target shifting in cases in which injury patterns are compared to possible injury-causing objects)

== Best practice ==
The National Research Council in the USA, as part of its proposals for reforms in the forensic sciences, has proposed virtopsy as "Best Practice" for the gathering of forensic evidence.

In addition, the International Society of Forensic Radiology and Imaging was founded in 2012 with the aim of enabling a continuous exchange of research results among its members and developing quality standards for the techniques employed.

A Technical Working Group Forensic Imaging Methods was founded in 2005 by Michael Thali and Richard Dirnhofer. It aims to promote an increasingly internationally standardised approach.

Furthermore, a Technical Working Group Postmortem Angiography Methods was founded in 2012 to promote best practice. Under the direction of the University Hospital of Lausanne and comprising nine European institutes of forensic medicine, it is developing reliable, standardized methods and guidelines for conducting and assessing postmortem angiographic examinations.

== Virtopsy project leading house ==
- Universität Zürich Institut für Rechtsmedizin
- The virtopsy website at the Institute of Forensic Medicine at the University of Zurich

== Institutes contributing to the Virtopsy project ==
- Institut für Rechtsmedizin der Universität Basel
- Charité Berlin, Institut für Rechtsmedizin
- University of Bern, Institut für Rechtsmedizin
- Centre universitaire romand de médecine légale, Lausanne - Genève (CURML)

== Institutes, districts or countries conducting post-mortem scanning ==
- India - 1. Department of Forensic Medicine and Toxicology, All India Institute of Medical Sciences- New Delhi

2. Department of Forensic Medicine, North Eastern Indira Gandhi Regional Institute of Health and Medical Sciences (NEIGRIHMS), Shillong.

3. Department of Forensic Medicine and Toxicology All India Institute of Medical Sciences- Rishikesh. AIIMS Rishikesh has started India’s first superspeciality course (D.M.) in Forensic Radiology and Virtual Autopsy.

4. Department of Forensic Medicine and Toxicology, Regional Institute of Medical Sciences (RIMS)- Imphal.

- Japan - Autopsy Imaging
- Australia - Melbourne - VIFM
- Europe - Denmark - Odense - Institute of Forensic Medicine, University of Southern Denmark
- United States - State of Maryland Medical Examiner

== Films ==
- The Virtopsy Process
- The Virtopsy Table
- Virtual Autopsy Table

== Books and journals ==
- Brogdons's Forensic Radiology, 2nd Edition. Eds: Michael J. Thali, Mark D. Viner, Byron Gil Brogdon. CRC Press; 2011.
- The Virtopsy Approach: 3D Optical and Radiological Scanning and Reconstruction in Forensic Medicine. Eds: Michael J. Thali, Richard Dirnhofer, Peter Vock. CRC Press; 2009.
- Entwicklung des Systems, Interview mit Thali
- Virtopsy – Obduktion neu in Bildern; Dirnhofer/Schick/Ranner, Schriftenreihe Recht der Medizin, 2010 Manz
- Revolution in der Gerichtsmedizin erschienen in "Öffentliche Sicherheit 9-10/09
- Die Virtopsie wird die Autopsie ablösen Erschienen in Kriminalpolizei Oktober/November 2009

== Virtopsies in popular culture ==
- In the CSI: Miami episode "Deep Freeze", Dr. Woods performs a virtopsy on a recently murdered athlete to prevent damaging him so that he could be cryogenically frozen.
- In the CSI: NY episode "Veritas", Sid does a virtual autopsy on Derek, showing Stella that the bullet that killed him entered through his cheek.
