= Lacuna magna =

Largest recess in the male urethra

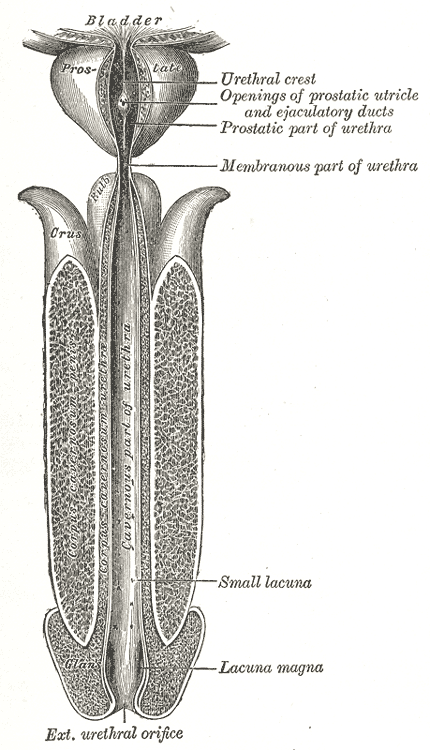
- The male urethra laid open on its anterior (upper) surface, lacuna magna labeled near the glans penis (bottom).

Details

Identifiers
- Latin: lacuna magna

In male anatomy, the lacuna magna (also called Guérin's sinus) is the largest of several recesses in the roof of the navicular fossa of the male urethra.

== Structure ==
The lacuna magna is a large recess in the roof of the navicular fossa of the male urethra.

=== Development ===
The embryological origin of the lacuna magna is contested. However, recent evidence suggests it and the navicular fossa of the male urethra derive from infiltrating endodermal cells of the urethral plate.

== Clinical significance ==
In young males, the presence of the lacuna magna is associated with painful urination (dysuria), bloody urine (hematuria), and bloody spotting of underwear.
