= Forensic radiology =

Forensic radiology is the discipline which comprises the performance, interpretation and reportage of the radiological examinations and procedures which are needed in court procedures or law enforcement. Radiological methods are widely used in identification, age estimation and establishing cause of death. Comparison of ante mortem and post mortem radiographs is one of the means of identification. The scanning of baggage, vehicles and individuals have many applications.

Tools like multislice helical computed tomography can be used for detailed documentation of injuries, tissue damage and complications like air embolism and pulmonary aspiration of blood. These types of digital autopsies offer certain advantages when compared to traditional autopsies.
