= Saint-Côme =

- Commune
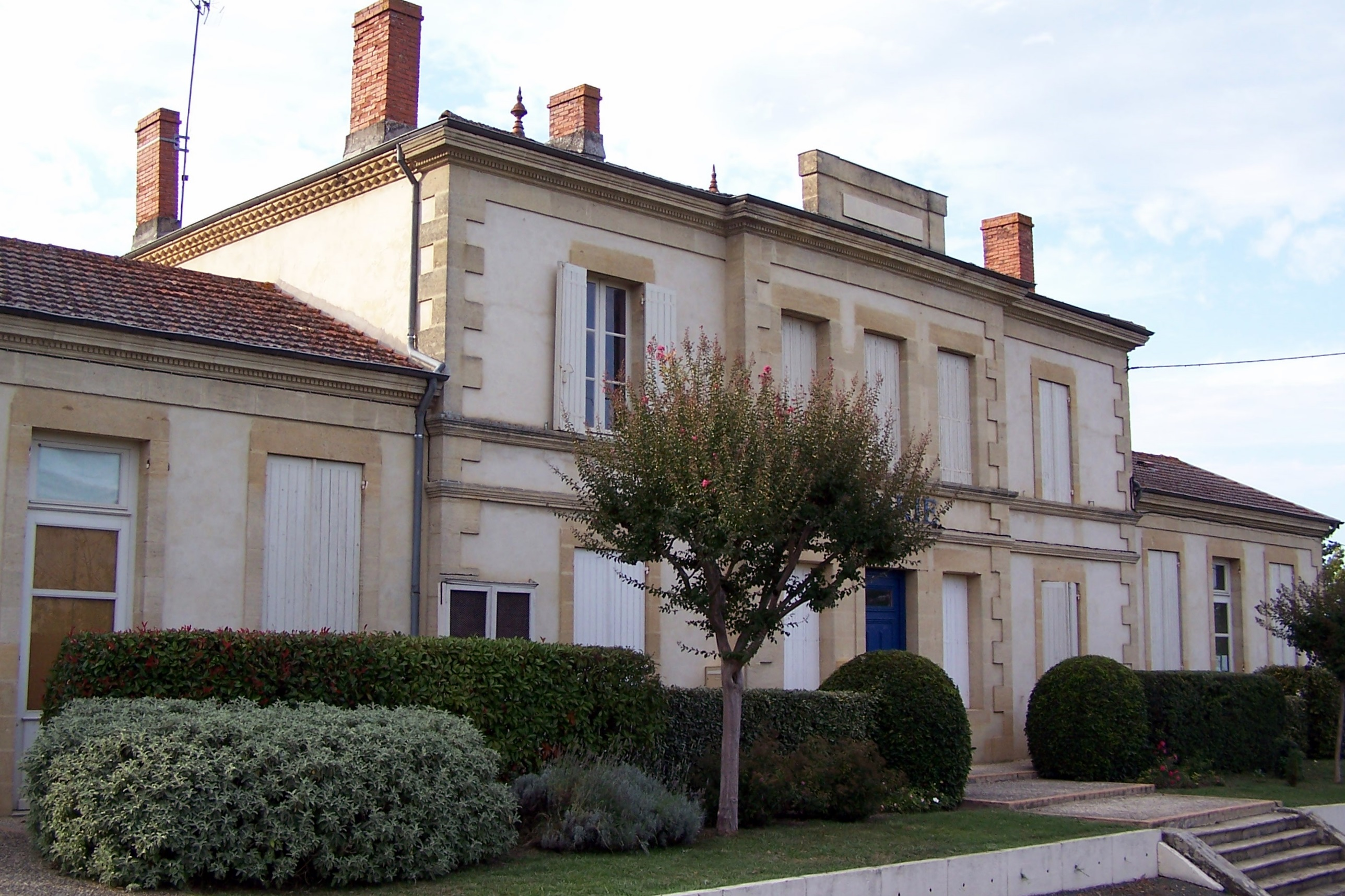
- Town hall

- Coat of arms
- Location of Saint-Côme
- Location within France Location within Nouvelle-Aquitaine
- Coordinates: 44°25′37″N 0°10′47″W
- Country: France
- Region: Nouvelle-Aquitaine
- Department: Gironde
- Arrondissement: Langon
- Canton: Le Sud-Gironde
- Intercommunality: Bazadais

Government
  - Mayor (2020–2026): Serge Mourlanne
- Area^{1}: 5.96 km^{2} (2.30 sq mi)
- Elevation: 50 m (160 ft)
- Highest elevation: 124 m (407 ft)
- Lowest elevation: 42 m (138 ft)
- Population (2023): 319
  - Density: 53.5/km^{2} (139/sq mi)
- Time zone: UTC+01:00 (CET)
  - Summer (DST): UTC+02:00 (CEST)
- INSEE/Postal code: 33391 /33430
- ^{1} French Land Register data, which excludes lakes, ponds, glaciers > 1 km^{2} (0.386 sq mi or 247 acres) and river estuaries.

Saint-Côme (French pronunciation: [sɛ̃ kom]; Occitan: Sent Còrme) is a commune in the Gironde department in Nouvelle-Aquitaine in southwestern France.

== Population ==
Historical population
Year	Pop.	±% p.a.
1968	249	—
1975	271	+1.22%
1982	278	+0.36%
1990	256	−1.03%
1999	249	−0.31%
2007	291	+1.97%
2012	305	+0.94%
2017	320	+0.96%
2023	319	−0.05%
Source: INSEE

== See also ==
- Communes of the Gironde department
