= Nederlands Tijdschrift voor Geneeskunde =

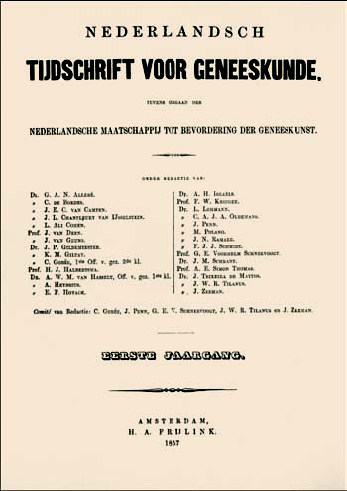
- Discipline: Medicine
- Language: Dutch
- Edited by: Yolanda van der Graaf

Publication details
- History: 1857-present
- Publisher: Vereniging Nederlands Tijdschrift voor Geneeskunde (Netherlands)
- Frequency: Weekly
- Open access: After 5 years

Standard abbreviations
- ISO 4: Ned. Tijdschr. Geneeskd.

Indexing
- CODEN: NETJAN
- ISSN: 0028-2162 (print); 1876-8784 (web)
- OCLC no.: 01642618

Links
- Journal homepage; Online access

The Nederlands Tijdschrift voor Geneeskunde (NTvG; English: Dutch Journal of Medicine) is the main medical journal in the Netherlands, appearing weekly. Established in 1857, it is one of the world's oldest journals. Its publication language is exclusively Dutch. The journal is published and supported by the Vereniging NTvG (English: Society NTvG), which is currently composed of 209 medical scientists. The current editor-in-chief is Marcel Olde Rikkert. The Journal's headquarter is situated in Amsterdam, the Netherlands.

From early on, the objective was to create an overarching and all-encompassing journal for medical professionals to exchange insights, knowledge and opinion, and to guarantee consistent progress throughout the country. At present, the main sections include: News, Opinion, Research, Clinical Practice, Perspective. Nowadays, the NTvG focuses on reviews and commentaries of research articles which are often published in English. Further, it continues to produce research of medical practice mainly in the Netherlands.

== History ==
The Journal was founded by the Nederlandsch Maatschappij tot bevordering der Geneeskunst (KNMG) in 1857 by a merger of five pre-existing journals: Practisch Tijdschrift voor Geneeskunde, Repertorium, Nederlandsch Weekblad voor Geneeskundigen, Tijdschrift voor Geregtelijke Geneeskunde en Psychiatries, Tijdschrift der Maatschappij. Admission to the merger was open to any medical journal agreeing to the terms and conditions. The main purpose of the Journal was (and continues to be) to spread medical knowledge, to harmonize current standards and to publish understandable articles about the most recent developments of the medical profession.

Especially in the first century of its existence, the NTvG published a variety of original research of Dutch medical professionals. Given the broad international medical community, the Journal included findings of foreign researchers translated into Dutch. On several occasions (e.g. in 1911), proposals were made to integrate a number of studies in their original language (often English or French). Nevertheless, these proposals were dismissed before a proper discussion could have sparked. Hence, the working language remains Dutch.

== Journal content ==
Following the years after the establishment, the Journal contained the following columns: original articles (30%), scientific publications of national and international medical practice (45%), state of the art of linked scientific journals (15%), and short reports (10%). Today, the focus has shifted towards foreign research and commentaries of various practices, also given the linguistic restrictions.

The NTvG hoped to establish common principles of medical practice throughout the country. This presumes that it is read and used by all Dutch medical practitioners. Its monopolistic position was later infringed by the establishment of various medical journals that have taken on a distinct stance, i.e. exclusively clinical studies. In 1946, the Nederlandsche Maatschappij tot Bevordering der Geneeskunst put an end to the cooperation and declared Medisch Contact as its new main organ. In 2018, the Journal's circulation is 17,000 copies. Taking into account its digital presence, the NTvG counts approximately 610,000 page views per month. To put things into perspective, in 2017, the KNMG recognized almost 46,000 medical practitioners in the Netherlands.

== Independence and advertisement ==
Since its establishment, the NTvG has been independent from other organizations or the national government and wishes to maintain this status. Advertisement i.e. by pharmaceutical actors is kept to a minimum; the Journal's statutes can be consulted for further information. The NTvG is financed mainly by its own profits.

== Other services ==
The NTvG is moreover equipped with a library, located in Amsterdam, which may be visited upon appointment. The library has a rich collection of medical-historical literature: the fields of anatomy, physiology, pathology, surgery, gynecology, obstetrics and botany are covered over a time span from 1500 to 1900.

The NTvG is a founding member of the International Committee of Medical Journal Editors. The Journal continues to follow the committee's "Recommendations for the Conduct, Reporting, Editing and Publication of Scholarly Work in Medical Journals". The NTvG's editorial office in Amsterdam is composed of clinicians working in Dutch hospitals and general practice. See below the list of editors in chief from 1857 to present.

== List of previous editors in chief ==
1857-1866	Jacobus Penn, established the Journal
1866-1884	Johannes Zeeman, established the Society
1884-1889	Ambrosius Arnoldus Guilielmus Guye, established a more stable production process
1889-1896	Constant Charles Delprat, wrote a book on the first 50 years of the Journal
1896-1903	Manuel Straub, established the first statutes on which the Journal and the Society are based
1904-1913	Hendrik Burger
1913-1946	Gérard Abraham van Rijnberk, established the library
1947-1949 and 1954	Johannes Jacobus van Loghem
1950-1954	Willem Kouwenaar
1955-1970	Jan Roelof Prakken
1971-1982	Leonard Barend Willem Jongkees
1983-1995	Arend Jan Dunning
1996- 2007	Jan van Gijn
2008-2015	Peter de Leeuw, reformed and digitalized the Journal
2016–present	Yolanda van der Graaf
