= Navicular fossa of male urethra =

Section of the urethra in male humans

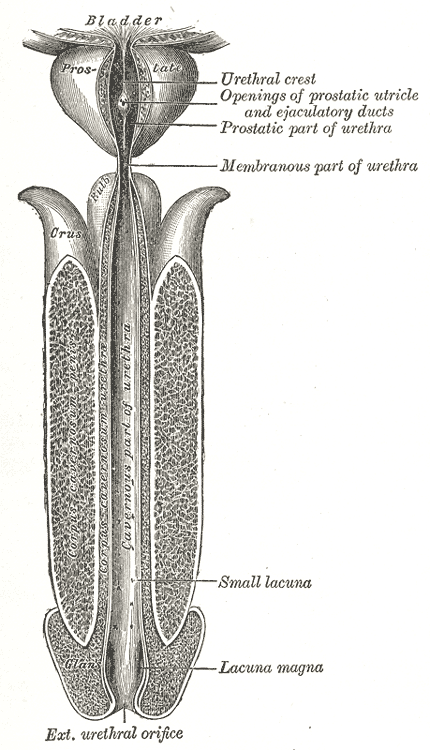
- The male urethra laid open on its anterior (upper) surface.

Details

Identifiers
- Latin: fossa navicularis urethrae

The navicular fossa is a short dilated portion of (the spongy (or cavernous or penile) portion of) the male urethra within the glans penis just proximal to the external urethral meatus. The roof of the fossa is especially dilated, forming a lacuna; medical instruments being inserted into the male urethra should initially be directed towards the floor of the fossa so as not to get snagged at the fossa. It is one of three dilations of the male urethra (the other two occurring at the prostate, and the bulb of penis).

The wall of the navicular fossa is the only part of the urethra that is lined with stratified squamous epithelium (instead of the transitional epithelium that is typical for the urinary tract).

During development, the glans of the penis is initially solid but cannulates to give rise to the navicular fossa.
