= Muscles of respiration =

Muscles involved in breathing

- Muscles of the body's respiration

Identifiers
- MeSH: D012132

The muscles of respiration are the muscles that contribute to inhalation and exhalation, by aiding in the expansion and contraction of the thoracic cavity. The diaphragm and, to a lesser extent, the intercostal muscles drive respiration during quiet breathing. The elasticity of these muscles is crucial to the health of the respiratory system and to maximize its functional capabilities.

== Diaphragm ==
The diaphragm is the major muscle responsible for breathing. It is a thin, dome-shaped muscle that separates the abdominal cavity from the thoracic cavity. During inhalation, the diaphragm contracts, so that its center moves caudally (downward) and its edges move cranially (upward). This compresses the abdominal cavity, raises the ribs upward and outward and thus expands the thoracic cavity. This expansion draws air into the lungs. When the diaphragm relaxes, elastic recoil of the lungs causes the thoracic cavity to contract, forcing air out of the lungs, and returning to its dome-shape. The diaphragm is also involved in non-respiratory functions, helping to expel vomit, faeces, and urine from the body by increasing intra-abdominal pressure, and preventing acid reflux by exerting pressure on the esophagus as it passes through the esophageal hiatus.

== Intercostal muscles ==
Along with the diaphragm, the intercostal muscles are one of the most important groups of respiratory muscles. These muscles are attached between the ribs and are important in manipulating the width of the rib cage. There are three layers of intercostal muscles. The external intercostal muscles are most important in respiration. These have fibres that are angled obliquely downward and forward from rib to rib. The contraction of these fibres raises each rib toward the rib above, with the overall effect of raising the rib cage, assisting in inhalation.

== Accessory muscles of respiration ==
Accessory muscles of respiration are muscles that assist, but do not play a primary role, in breathing. Use of these while at rest is often interpreted as a sign of respiratory distress. There is no definitive list of accessory muscles, but the sternocleidomastoid and the scalenes (anterior, middle, and posterior) are typically included, as they assist in elevating the rib cage. The involvement of these muscles seems to depend on the degree of respiratory effort. During quiet breathing, the scalenes are consistently physically active, while the sternocleidomastoids are quiet. With an increase in the respiratory volume, sternocleidomastoids also become active. Both muscles are simultaneously activated when one breathes in at the maximal flow rate.

Apart from the above neck muscles, the following muscles have also been observed contributing to respiration: serratus anterior, pectoralis major and pectoralis minor, trapezius, latissimus dorsi, erector spinae, iliocostalis, quadratus lumborum, serratus posterior superior, serratus posterior inferior, levatores costarum, transversus thoracis, subclavius (Kendall et al., 2005). The levator labii superioris alaeque nasi muscle lifts the sides of the nostrils.

== Muscles of exhalation ==
During quiet breathing, there is little or no muscle contraction involved in exhalation; this process is simply driven by the elastic recoil of the lungs. When forceful exhalation is required, or when the elasticity of the lungs is reduced (as in emphysema), active exhalation can be achieved by contraction of the abdominal wall muscles (rectus abdominis, transverse abdominis, external oblique muscle, pyramidalis and internal oblique muscle). These press the abdominal organs cranially (upward) into the diaphragm, reducing the volume of the thoracic cavity.

The internal intercostal muscles have fibres that are angled obliquely downward and backward from rib to rib. These muscles can therefore assist in lowering the rib cage, adding force to exhalation.
