= Intercostal space =

Anatomic space between two ribs

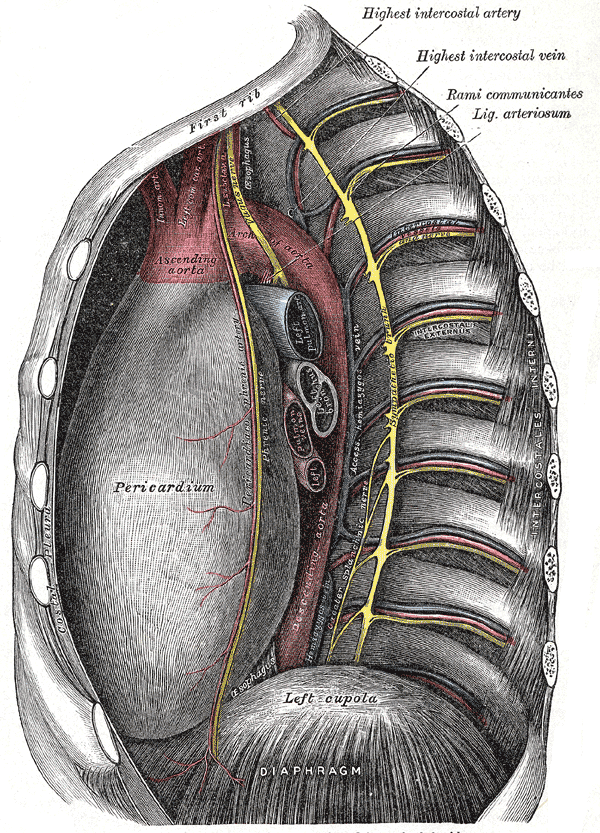
- Intercostal spaces, viewed from the right.

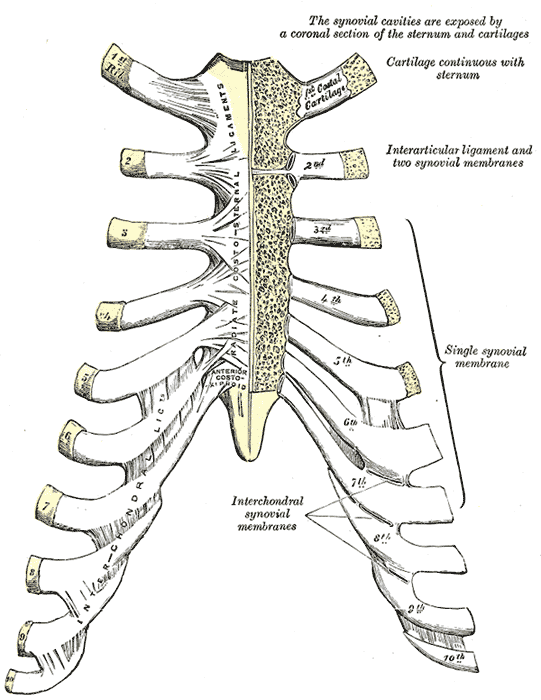
- Sternocostal and interchondral articulations. Anterior view.

Details

Identifiers
- Latin: spatium intercostale
- TA98: A02.3.04.007
- TA2: 1102
- FMA: 12243

The intercostal space (ICS) is the anatomic space between two ribs (Lat. costa). Since there are 12 ribs on each side, there are 11 intercostal spaces, each numbered for the rib superior to it.

== Structures in intercostal space ==
- several kinds of intercostal muscle
- intercostal arteries and intercostal veins
- intercostal lymph nodes
- intercostal nerves

== Order of components ==
=== Muscles ===
There are 3 muscular layers in each intercostal space, consisting of the external intercostal muscle, the internal intercostal muscle, and the thinner innermost intercostal muscle. These muscles help to move the ribs during breathing.

=== Neurovascular bundles ===
Neurovascular bundles are located between the internal intercostal muscle and the innermost intercostal muscle. The neurovascular bundle has a strict order of vein-artery-nerve (VAN), from top to bottom. This neurovascular bundle runs high in the intercostal space, and the smaller collateral neurovascular bundle runs just superior to the lower rib of the space (in the order NAV from superior to inferior). Invasive procedures such as thoracentesis are performed with oblique entry of the instrument, directly above the upper margin of the relevant rib, to avoid damaging the neurovascular bundles.

==== Nerves ====
In reference to the muscles of the thoracic wall, the intercostal nerves and vessels run posterior to the internal intercostal muscles: therefore, they are generally covered on the inside by the parietal pleura, except when they are covered by the innermost intercostal muscles, innermost intercostal membrane, subcostal muscles or the transversus thoracis muscle.
