= Serratus posterior =

Serratus posterior may refer to:

- Serratus posterior superior muscle, a thin, quadrilateral muscle, situated at the upper and back part of the thorax
- Serratus posterior inferior muscle, a muscle that lies at the junction of the thoracic and lumbar regions
