= Serratus =

Serratus may refer to any of several muscles in the thorax (trunk). See:

- Serratus anterior muscle
- Serratus posterior superior muscle
- Serratus posterior inferior muscle
