= Subcostal =

Subcostal may refer to:

- Subcostal nerve
- Subcostal arteries
- Subcostalis muscle
