= Nuchal fascia =

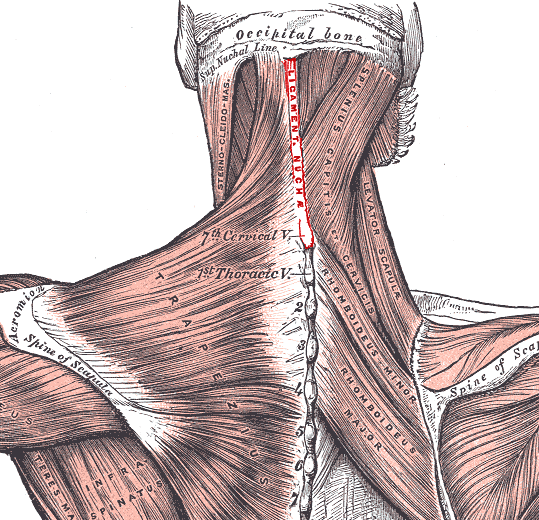
- The bulge of the deeper layer of the nuchal fascia is also called the nuchal ligament.

Details

Identifiers
- Latin: Fascia nuchae
- TA98: A04.3.01.017
- TA2: 2219
- FMA: 76867

The nuchal fascia is a fascia covering the autochthonous musculature of the neck as a part of the cervical fascia. It proceeds the thoracolumbar fascia to the top (cranial). The fascia itself is made of two parts: A superficial layer (lat.: Fascia nuchae superficialis) and a deeper layer that is located among the Trapezius muscle and that sheaths the deeper cervical musculature from dorsal side. Expanding laterally, the fascia also covers the dorsal musculature. In the middle of the deeper layer a bulge is resided – the nuchal ligament.

== Sources ==
=== Literature ===
- Rickenbacher, J; Landolt, AM; Theiler, K (2013-06-29). Applied Anatomy of the Back. Springer. p. 88. ISBN 9783662057919.
- Strunk, Angelika (2013). Fasziale Osteopathie: Grundlagen und Techniken [Fascial osteopathy: foundations and technics] (in German) (2 ed.). Georg Thieme Verlag. ISBN 978-3-83-047922-2.
