= Wade Miley =

American baseball player (born 1986)

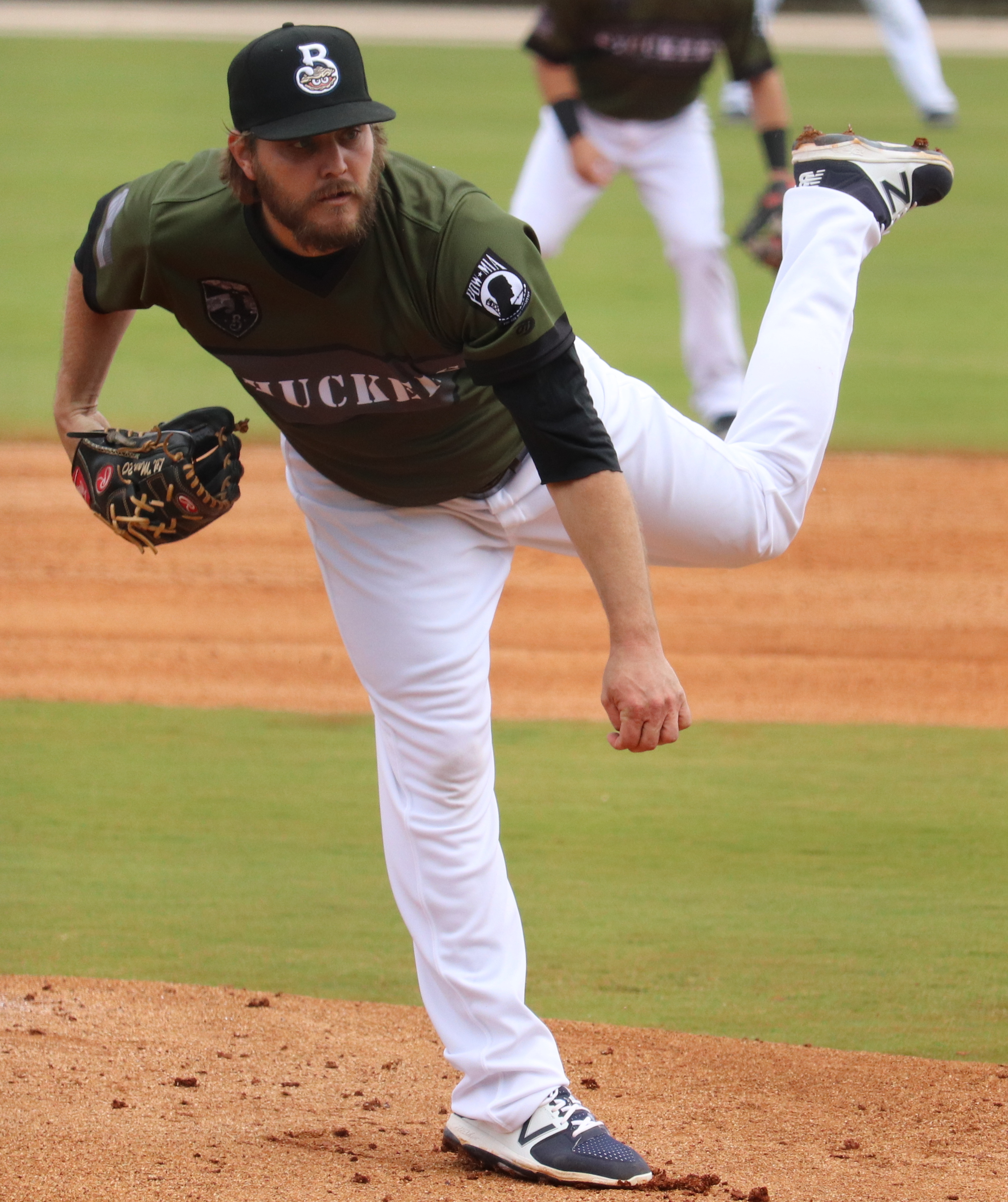
- Miley with the Biloxi Shuckers in 2018

Free agent
- Pitcher
- Born: November 13, 1986 (age 40); Hammond, Louisiana, U.S.
- Bats: Left Throws: Left

MLB debut
- August 20, 2011, for the Arizona Diamondbacks

MLB statistics (through 2025 season)
- Win–loss record: 109–99
- Earned run average: 4.09
- Strikeouts: 1,368
- Stats at Baseball Reference

Teams
- Arizona Diamondbacks (2011–2014); Boston Red Sox (2015); Seattle Mariners (2016); Baltimore Orioles (2016–2017); Milwaukee Brewers (2018); Houston Astros (2019); Cincinnati Reds (2020–2021); Chicago Cubs (2022); Milwaukee Brewers (2023–2024); Cincinnati Reds (2025)

Career highlights and awards
- All-Star (2012); Pitched a no-hitter on May 7, 2021

Wade Allen Miley (born November 13, 1986) is an American professional baseball pitcher who is a free agent. He has previously played in Major League Baseball (MLB) for the Arizona Diamondbacks, Boston Red Sox, Seattle Mariners, Baltimore Orioles, Milwaukee Brewers, Houston Astros, Cincinnati Reds, and Chicago Cubs.

Miley played college baseball at Southeastern Louisiana University and the Diamondbacks selected him in the first round of the 2008 MLB draft. He made his MLB debut with the Diamondbacks in 2011 and was an All-Star in 2012. On May 7, 2021, he threw a no-hitter against the Cleveland Indians.

== Early life and career ==
Miley was born in Hammond, Louisiana, but grew up in Loranger, a town of 6,100 residents and 1,924 households. His father, Wendell, was a mechanic for 18 wheelers. Miley attended Loranger High School and Southeastern Louisiana University, where he played college baseball for the Southeastern Louisiana Lions baseball team. In 2007, he played collegiate summer baseball with the Wareham Gatemen of the Cape Cod Baseball League and was named a league all-star.

== Professional career ==
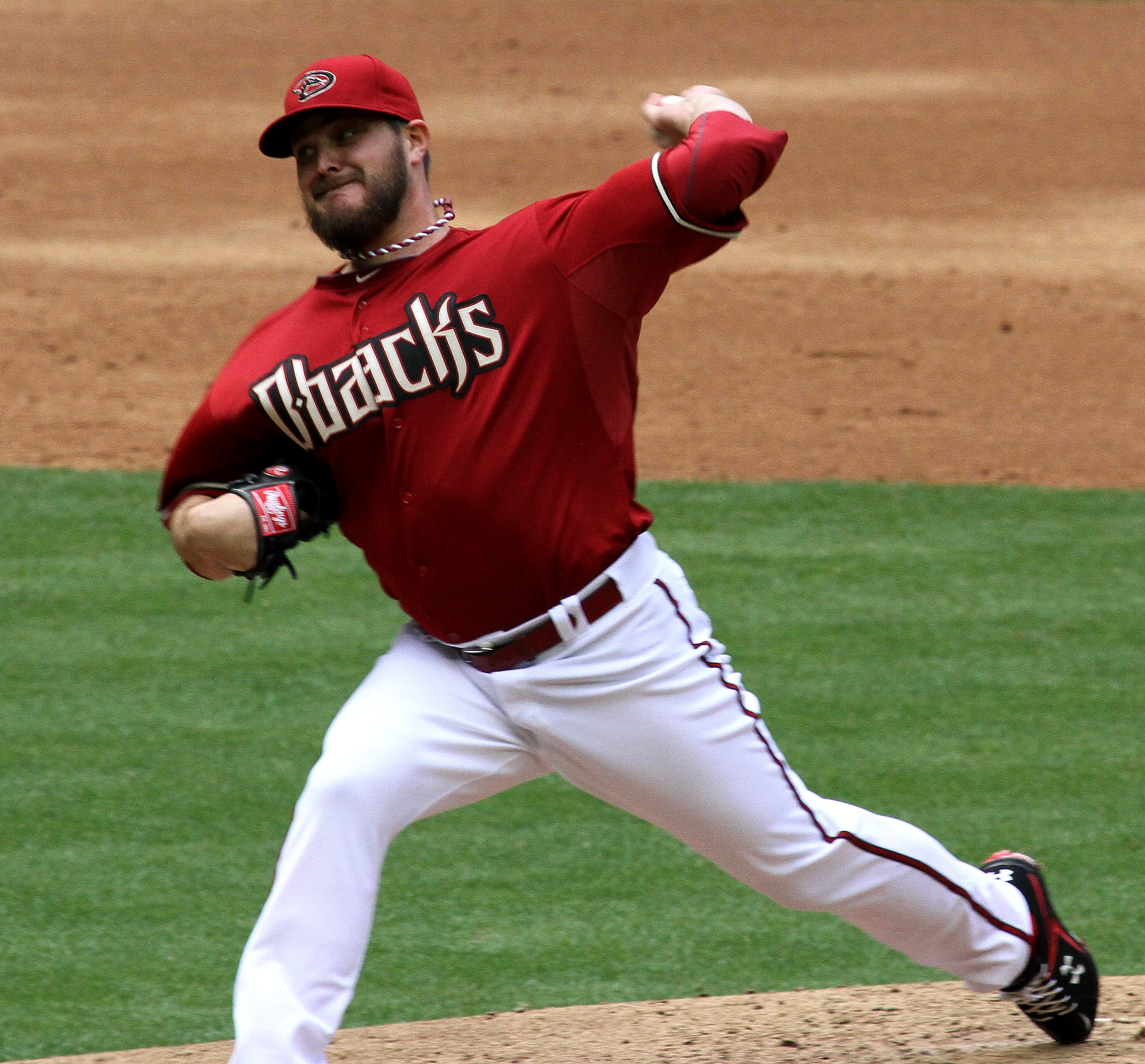
Miley pitching for the Arizona Diamondbacks in 2013

=== Arizona Diamondbacks ===
The Arizona Diamondbacks selected Miley in the first round, 43rd overall, of the 2008 Major League Baseball draft. He made his debut professionally with the Yakima Bears of the Low-A Northwest League. Miley was called up to the majors for the first time on August 15, 2011, and would finish the season with a 4–2 record in eight games (seven starts).

Miley was named the National League (NL) Rookie of the Month for April 2012, pitching 3–0 with a 1.29 earned-run average (ERA), striking out 15 in 21 innings in two starts. Miley took a no-hitter into the 6th inning against Miami. He was also named a NL All-Star in his rookie season after beginning the 2012 season with a 9–5 record with a 3.04 ERA. Later that season on October 1, 2012, Miley pitched an immaculate inning in a game facing the Colorado Rockies. Miley won 16 games for the Diamondbacks in 29 starts in 2012. He also made 3 relief appearances. He had an ERA of 3.33 in 194 2/3 innings.

Miley was voted runner-up for the National League Rookie of the Year in 2012, narrowly losing to Bryce Harper of the Washington Nationals.

On April 22, 2013, Miley hit his first career home run. Miley took a step back from his strong rookie season, managing just 10 wins despite pitching over 200 innings. In 2014, Miley would pitch to a 4.34 ERA with 183 strikeouts and a win–loss record of 8–12.

=== Boston Red Sox ===
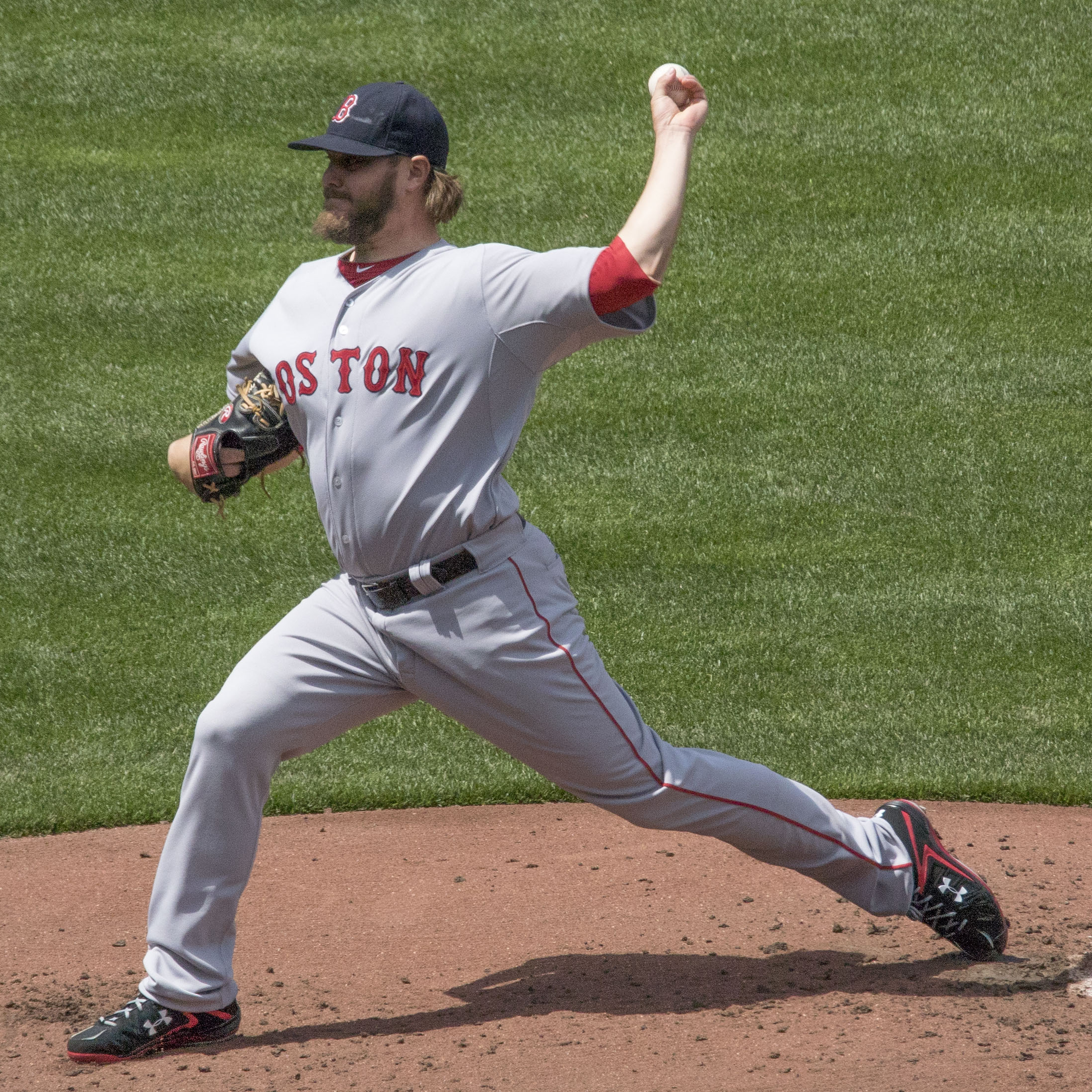
Miley pitching for the Boston Red Sox in 2015

On December 12, 2014, the Diamondbacks traded Miley to the Boston Red Sox in exchange for pitchers Rubby De La Rosa and Allen Webster and infielder Raymel Flores. On February 5, 2015, Miley and the Red Sox agreed on a three-year $19.25 million contract extension. On April 21, Miley won his first game with the Red Sox, throwing 5 2/3 shutout innings versus the Tampa Bay Rays. For the season, Miley pitched to a 4.46 ERA in 32 starts, compiling an 11–11 record with 147 strikeouts across 193 2/3 innings pitched.

=== Seattle Mariners ===
On December 7, 2015, the Red Sox traded Miley and Jonathan Aro to the Seattle Mariners in exchange for Roenis Elías and Carson Smith. Miley struggled during his stint with Seattle, pitching to a 4.98 ERA and a 7–8 record with 82 strikeouts. In his last start for the team, he pitched seven scoreless innings against the Chicago Cubs.

=== Baltimore Orioles ===
On July 31, 2016, the Mariners traded Miley to the Baltimore Orioles in exchange for Ariel Miranda. In August, he made six starts, pitching to a 7.14 ERA in 29 innings and had a 1–3 record. The Orioles went 2–4 in his starts. On September 18, Miley pitched four scoreless innings against the Tampa Bay Rays, before being pulled with a back injury. He returned his next start, taking a shutout into the 9th inning against his former team the Diamondbacks. He ended pitching 8 2/3 innings before allowing an RBI double. He struck out a career-high 11 batters in his best start in an Orioles uniform. Overall, Miley finished 2–5 in 11 starts with an ERA of 6.17 for Baltimore. The following season, Miley was tabbed as the #4 starter in the rotation. He endured his worst season of his career, setting career worsts in ERA for a full season (5.61), losses (15), home runs allowed (25) and walks (93). He also pitched in a career low 157 1/3 innings pitched. On July 30, 2017, Miley gave up Adrián Beltré's 3,000th career hit. On November 3, 2017, the Orioles declined Miley's 2018 option.

=== Milwaukee Brewers ===
On February 14, 2018, Miley signed a minor league contract with the Milwaukee Brewers. He began the season with the Double-A Biloxi Shuckers, but was called up a couple of weeks later. Miley pitched in two starts before landing on the 60 day disabled list with an oblique injury. He was activated off the disabled list on July 12, going 5–2 with a 2.57 ERA with 50 strikeouts in 16 starts. Miley also started Game 3 of the Division Series, along with Games 2, 5, and 6 of the NLCS.

In Game 5 he faced only one hitter before being replaced with a right-handed pitcher. This made Miley only the second starter in postseason history to face a single batter and the first to do so without getting the batter out. By starting Game 6 he became the first pitcher in 88 years to start back-to-back postseason games.

=== Houston Astros ===
Miley signed a one-year contract worth $4.5 million with the Houston Astros on February 1, 2019. In 33 starts for Houston, he posted a 14–6 record with a 3.98 ERA with 140 strikeouts over 167 1/3 innings of work, but did not make the World Series roster.

=== Cincinnati Reds ===
On December 18, 2019, Miley signed a two-year contract, with a club option, worth $15 million with the Cincinnati Reds. In a COVID-19 shortened season, Miley was 0–3 with a 5.65 ERA with 12 strikeouts in 14 1/3 innings pitched over 6 games (4 starts).

On May 7, 2021, Miley threw the 17th no-hitter in Reds history, striking out eight batters while allowing only two baserunners in the 3–0 win against the Cleveland Indians. It was the fourth no-hitter of the season and the second in three days after John Means of the Baltimore Orioles threw his against the Seattle Mariners. Miley finished the 2021 season with a 12–7 record and 3.37 ERA with 125 strikeouts over 28 starts.

=== Chicago Cubs ===
On November 5, 2021, the Reds placed Miley on waivers and he was claimed by the Chicago Cubs. Miley only made eight starts for the Cubs (plus, one relief appearance) in 2022 due to injuries, and logged a 3.16 ERA with 28 strikeouts over 37 innings of work.

=== Milwaukee Brewers (second stint) ===
On January 9, 2023, Miley signed with the Milwaukee Brewers on a one-year $4.5 million deal with a mutual option for the 2024 season. Miley made 8 starts for the Brewers before leaving a May 16 start against the St. Louis Cardinals with a lat injury. On May 19, it was announced that Miley would miss 6–8 weeks after being diagnosed with a posterior serratus strain. After the season, Miley declined the option on his contract for the 2024 season and became a free agent.

On December 4, 2024, Miley re–signed with Milwaukee on a one-year contract worth $7 million along with a mutual option for the 2025 season. He made two starts for Milwaukee (posting a 6.43 ERA with two strikeouts) before he was placed on the injured list with left elbow inflammation. On April 26, 2024, it was announced that Miley would undergo Tommy John surgery, ending his season. On October 31, the Brewers declined his option, making him a free agent.

=== Cincinnati Reds (second stint) ===
On January 29, 2025, Miley signed a minor league contract with the Cincinnati Reds. In seven starts split between the High-A Dayton Dragons and Triple-A Louisville Bats, he struggled to a 1-2 record and 8.84 ERA with 15 strikeouts across 19 1/3 innings pitched. On June 1, Miley opted out of his contract and became a free agent. On June 4, Miley re-signed with Cincinnati on a major league contract. In three appearances (two starts) for Cincinnati, Miley posted a 1-0 record and 6.75 ERA with seven strikeouts over 12 innings of work. On June 20, Miley was placed on the injured list due to a left flexor strain. He was transferred to the 60-day injured list on July 31.

== Pitching style ==
He throws four main pitches with an occasional fifth. The main four are four-seam fastball and two-seam fastballs (ranging from 88–92 miles per hour (142–148 km/h)), a slider (79–82 miles per hour (127–132 km/h)), and a changeup to right-handed hitters (80–81 miles per hour (129–130 km/h)). The least commonly thrown is a curveball in the mid-upper 70s, mostly against right-handers. His favored off-speed pitch with two strikes is the slider.

== Personal life ==
Miley has been an avid hunter since the age of three. Growing up in Louisiana, Miley was a fan of the Atlanta Braves. He currently spends his off-season on his ranch near Austin, Texas.

Miley and his wife, Katy, have one child, a son who was born in September 2016.

In June 2025, Miley was accused in court documents of having supplied pain pills containing oxycodone to fellow Major League pitcher Tyler Skaggs, who died of an accidental drug overdose in 2019, and was found to have had oxycodone in his system at the time. Miley responded to the accusation by saying he had "never been accused of any wrongdoing."

== See also ==
- Arizona Diamondbacks award winners and league leaders
- List of Cincinnati Reds no-hitters
- List of Major League Baseball no-hitters
- List of Major League Baseball pitchers who have thrown an immaculate inning

Awards and achievements
Preceded by John Means	No-hitter pitcher May 7, 2021	Succeeded by Spencer Turnbull
Preceded by Dee Gordon	NL Rookie of the Month; April 2012	Succeeded by Bryce Harper
