= ICNB =

Abbreviation ICNB may refer to:

- Institute for Nature Conservation and Biodiversity, a Portuguese government agency
- International Code of Nomenclature of Bacteria, a scientific classification
- Intercostal nerve block, a medical procedure
