= External intercostal membrane =

Connective tissue between the ribs

Details

Identifiers
- Latin: membrana intercostalis externa
- TA98: A03.3.01.002
- TA2: 1710
- FMA: 10475

Unlike the other two intercostal muscles, the external intercostal muscle does not retain its muscular character all the way to the sternum, and so the tissue in this location is called the external intercostal membrane.

The fibers of the external intercostal muscles run downward and forward between adjacent ribs. Each muscle begins posteriorly at the tubercles of the ribs and extends anteriorly to the costochondral junction, the junction between the costal cartilage and the sternal end of the rib. The muscle between the costal cartilages is replaced by a membranous layer called the external intercostal membrane.

== See also ==
- Aponeuroses
