= Innermost intercostal muscle =

Layer of muscles of the ribs

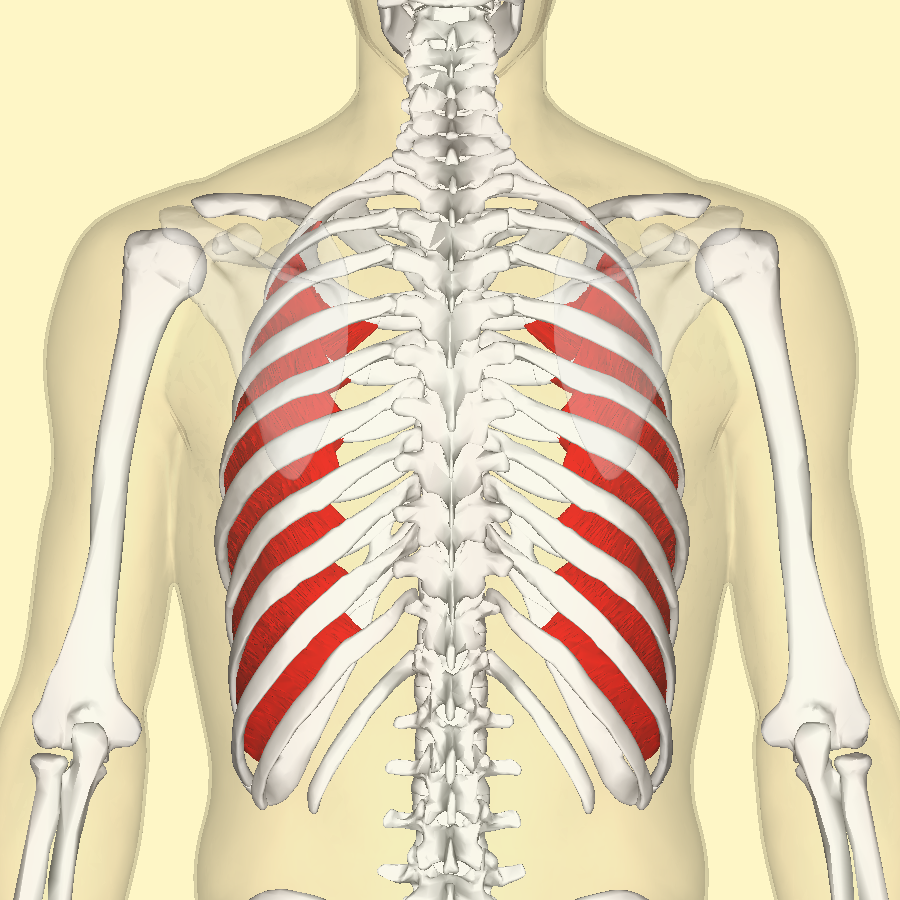
- Innermost intercostal muscle (red), seen from back.

Details
- Origin: Infero-posterior border of each rib (above)
- Insertion: Supero-posterior border of the rib (below)
- Artery: Intercostal arteries
- Nerve: Intercostal nerves
- Actions: Through adduction of upper ribs to the lower ribs the muscles narrow intercostal slits and diminish thorax volume, therefore the muscles represent expiratory muscles.

Identifiers
- Latin: musculus intercostalis intimus
- TA98: A04.4.01.014
- TA2: 2313
- FMA: 74086

The innermost intercostal muscle is a layer of intercostal muscles. It may also be called the intima of the internal intercostal muscles. It is the deepest muscular layer of the thorax, with muscle fibres running vertically (in parallel with the internal intercostal muscles). It is present only in the middle of each intercostal space, and often not present higher up the rib cage. It lies deep to the plane that contains the intercostal nerves and intercostal vessels, and the internal intercostal muscles. The diaphragm is continuous with the innermost intercostal muscle.

== Additional images ==
Innermost intercostal muscle (shown in red). Animation.

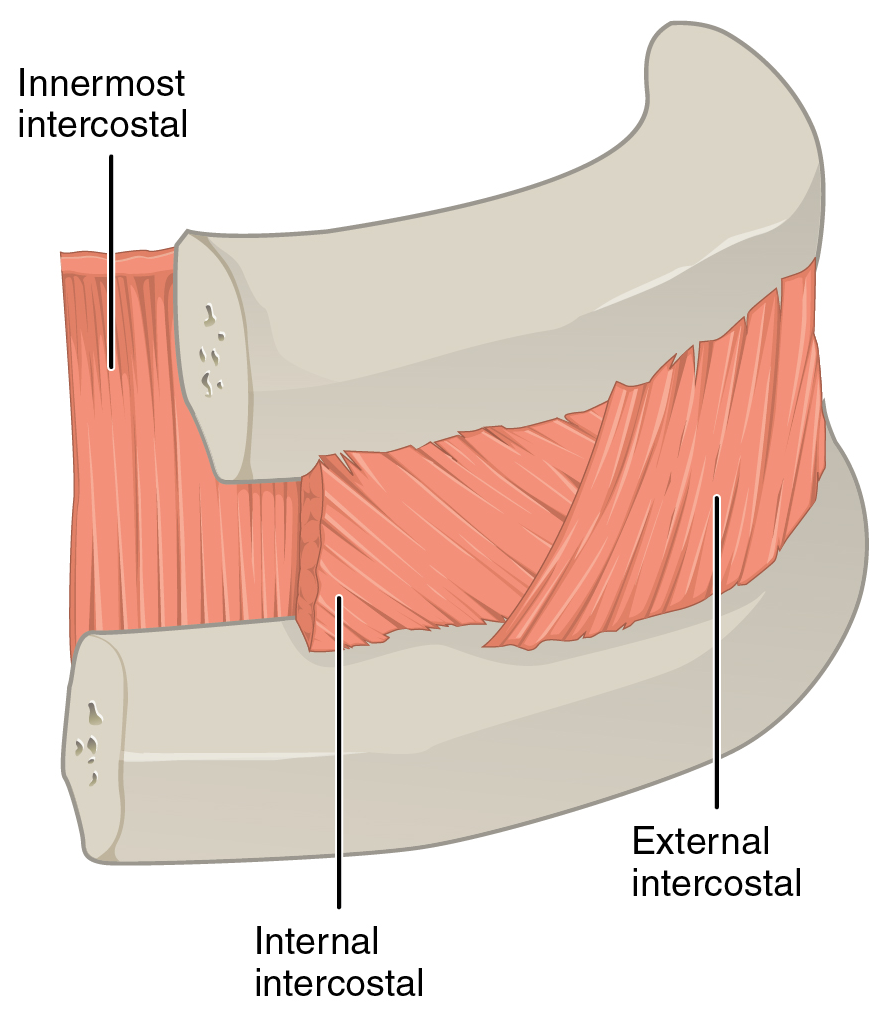
A cutout of the thoracic wall showing the three layers of intercostal muscle - from the left wall.
