= Lumbar fascia =

The lumbar fascia is the lumbar portion of the thoracolumbar fascia. It consists of three fascial layers - posterior, middle, and anterior - that enclose two (anterior and posterior) muscular compartments. The anterior and middle layers occur only in the lumbar region, whereas the posterior layer (as part of the thoracolumbar fascia) extends superiorly to the inferior part of the neck, and the inferiorly to the dorsal surface of the sacrum. The quadratus lumborum is contained in the anterior muscular compartment (between anterior and middle layers), and the erector spinae in the posterior compartment (between middle and posterior layers). Psoas major lies anterior to the anterior layer. Various superficial muscles of the posterior thorax and abdomen arise from the posterior layer - namely the latissimus dorsi, and serratus posterior inferior.

== Anatomy ==
The posterior layer and middle layer unite at the lateral margin of erector spinae, forming a though raphe; all three layers then unite at the lateral margin of quadratus lumborum, thus forming the aponeurotic origin of the transversus abdominis muscle.

=== Layers ===
==== Posterior layer ====
The posterior layer is thick, being reinforced by the aponeurosis (origin) of the latissimus dorsi muscle. It consists of a superficial lamina derived primarily from the latissimus dorsi and serratus posterior inferior, and a deeper lamina which forms a retinacular sheet encapsulating the paraspinal muscles. The posterior layer is attached to the spinous processes of lumbar and sacral vertebrae, and to the supraspinous ligament.

At sacral levels, the posterior layer attaches to the posterior superior iliac spines, and posterior iliac crest, fuses with the underlying erector spinae muscle aponeurosis, and extends along the transverse tubercles of the sacrum.

In the thoracic region, the posterior layer (i.e. thoracic part of thoracolumbar fascia) attaches to the supraspinous ligament and spinous processes of all thoracic vertebrae, and to the costal angles of all ribs. It extends as far superiorly as the inferior part of the neck.

==== Middle layer ====
The middle layer is attached superiorly to the inferior margin of the 12th rib, and the lumbocostal ligament, medially to the tips of transverse processes of lumbar vertebrae, and inferiorly to the posterior part of the intermediate area of the iliac crest.

==== Anterior layer ====
The anterior layer is the thinnest of the three layers. The anterior layer forms the lateral arcuate ligament superiorly, is attached medially to anterior surfaces of transverse processes of lumbar vertebra, and is attached inferiorly to the iliolumbar ligament and adjoining iliac crest.

=== Relations ===
The ascending colon and descending colon lie upon the lumbar fascia.

The lumbar fascia gives origin to the latissimus dorsi muscle (which arises from posterior layer of lumbar fascia), abdominal internal oblique muscle (which arises along the entire length of the lumbar fascia), transversus abdominis muscle, and gluteus maximus muscle.

The psoas fascia (a part of the iliac fascia) laterally blends with the lumbar fascia. The lateral arcuate ligament arises as a thickening of the lumbar fascia. The superior band of the iliolumbar ligament is continuous with the anterior layer of lumbar fascia. The inferior portion of the supraspinous ligament becomes indistinct amid the lumbar fascia.

Each subcostal artery passes across the anterior surface of the lumbar fascia before reaching the anterior abdominal wall. Each subcostal nerve passes across the anterior aspect of the anterior layer of lumbar fascia. The ilioinguinal nerve pierces the anterior layer of lumbar fascia posterior to the kidney to come to pass inferoanteriorly anterior to the anterior layer of lumbar fascia.

== Function ==
The lumbar fascia binds the deep muscles of the back to the spine and to the transverse processes of the vertebrae. Additionally the lumbar fascia is an attachment for the gluteus maximus muscle and the latissimus dorsi muscle.
