= Transversus thoracis muscle =

Muscle of the torso

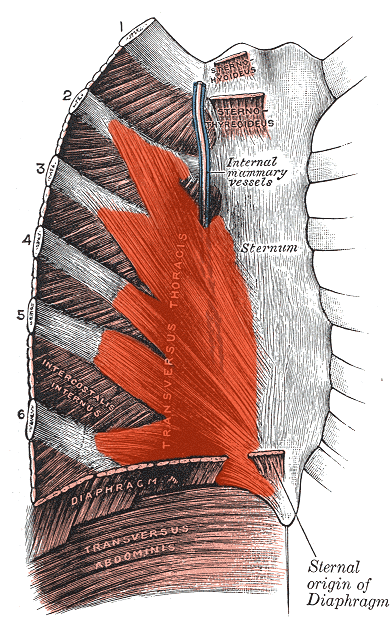
- Posterior surface of sternum and costal cartilages, showing transversus thoracis.

Details
- Origin: Costal cartilages of last 3-4 true ribs, body of sternum and xiphoid process
- Insertion: Ribs/costal cartilages 2-6
- Artery: Intercostal arteries
- Nerve: Intercostal nerves
- Actions: Depresses ribs

Identifiers
- Latin: musculus transversus thoracis
- TA98: A04.4.01.016
- TA2: 2315
- FMA: 9760

The transversus thoracis muscle (/trænzˈvɜːrsəs θəˈreɪsɪs/), also known as triangularis sterni, lies internal to the thoracic cage, anteriorly. It is usually a thin plane of muscular and tendinous fibers, however on athletic individuals it can be a thick 'slab of meat', situated upon the inner surface of the front wall of the chest. It is in the same layer as the subcostal muscles and the innermost intercostal muscles.

== Structure ==
It arises on either side from the lower third of the posterior surface of the body of the sternum, from the posterior surface of the xiphoid process, and from the sternal ends of the costal cartilages of the lower three or four true ribs.

Its fibers diverge upward and lateralward, to be inserted by slips into the lower borders and inner surfaces of the costal cartilages of the second, third, fourth, fifth, and sixth ribs.

The lowest fibers of this muscle are horizontal in their direction, and are continuous with those of the transversus abdominis; the intermediate fibers are oblique, while the highest are almost vertical.

This muscle varies in its attachments, not only in different subjects, but on opposite sides of the same subject.

The muscle is supplied by the anterior rami of the thoracic spinal nerves (intercostal nerves).

== Function ==
Contraction of transversus thoracis aids in forced expiration. Examples of forced expiration include laughing, coughing, and sneezing. It acommoplishes this action by decreasing the transverse diameter of the thoracic cage.

== Additional images ==
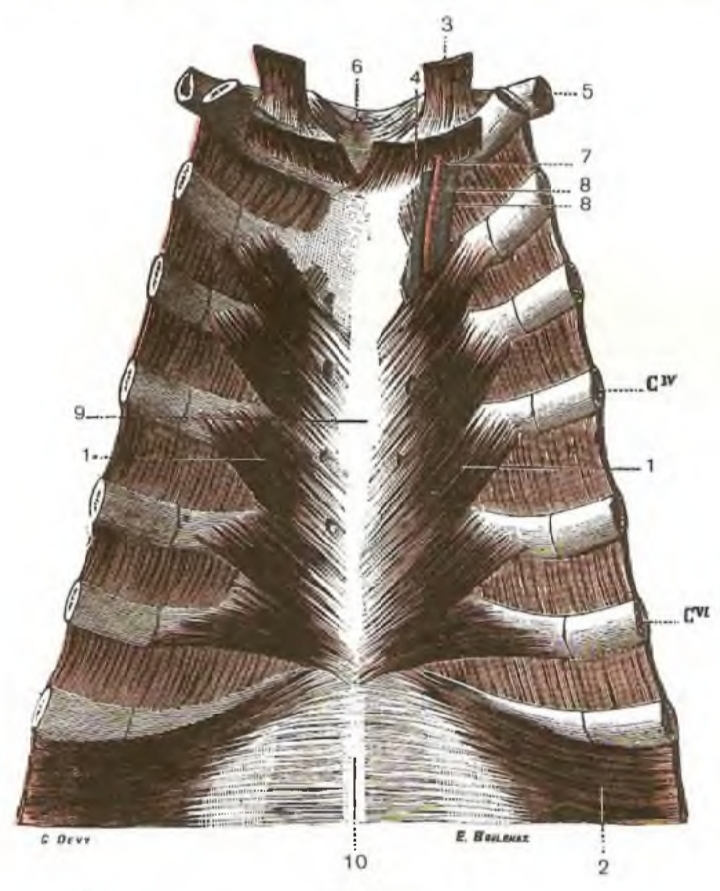
Right transversus thoracis and left transversus thoracis. 1, 1, both transversus thoracis muscles — 2, right transversus abdominis muscle — 3, right sterno-hyoid muscle — 4, right sterno-thyroid muscle — 5, right clavicle — 6, interclavicular ligament — 7, right-sided internal thoracic artery — 8, paired internal thoracic veins — 9, sternum — 10, linea alba — CIV, CVI, fourth and sixth ribs. (After Testut.)

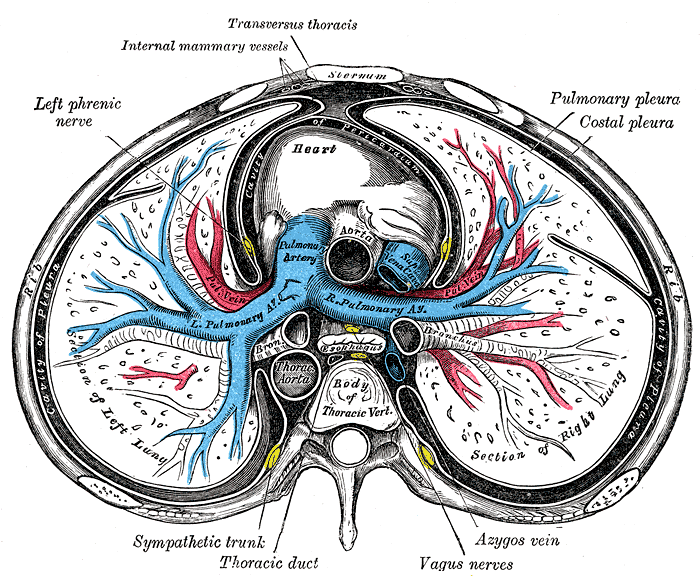
Transverse section of thorax, showing relations of pulmonary artery.

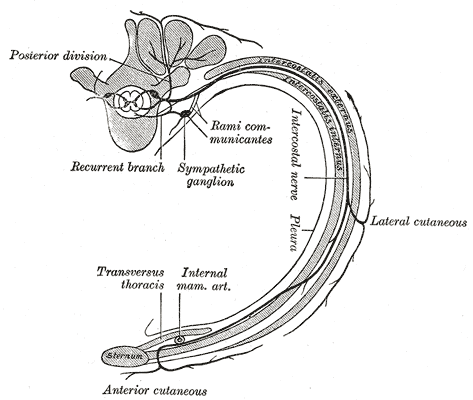
Diagram of the course and branches of a typical intercostal nerve.
