= Thoracolumbar fascia =

Anatomical feature

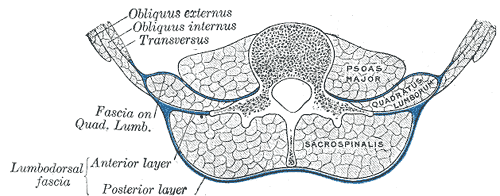
- Diagram of a transverse section of the posterior abdominal wall, to show the disposition of the lumbodorsal fascia.

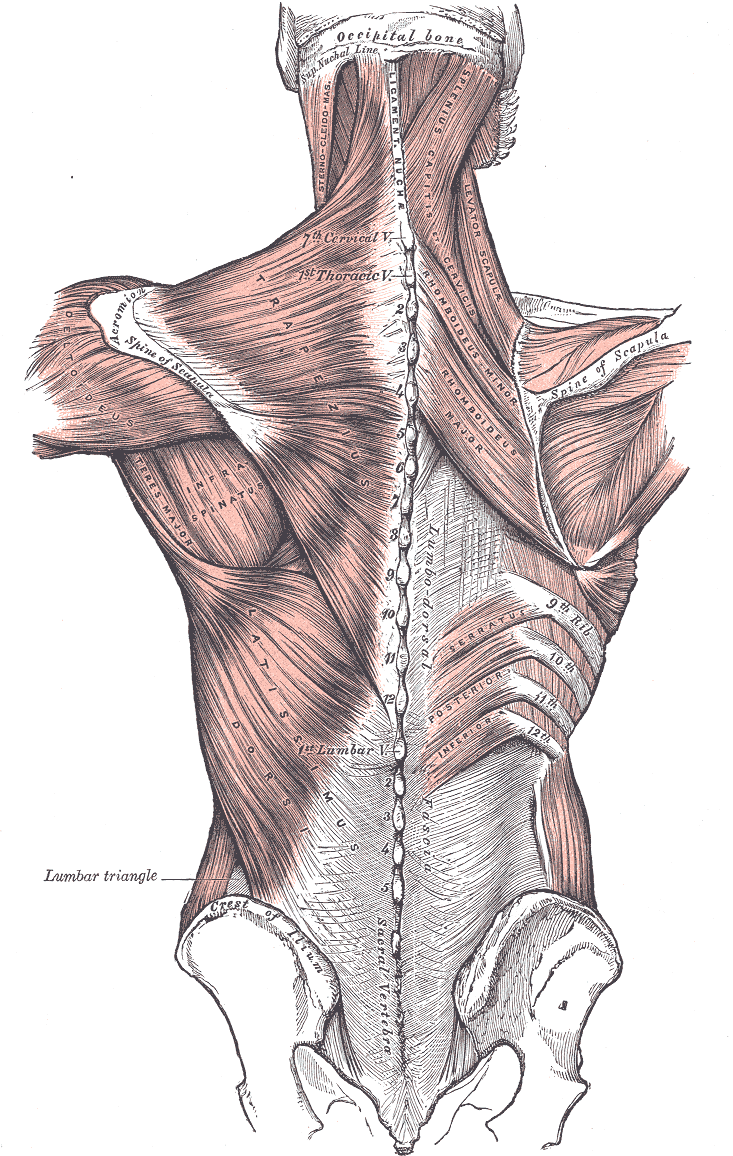
- Superficial muscles of the back. The thoracolumbar fascia is the gray area at bottom center.

Details

Identifiers
- Latin: fascia thoracolumbalis, fascia lumbodorsalis
- TA98: A04.3.02.501
- TA2: 2242
- FMA: 25072

The thoracolumbar fascia (lumbodorsal fascia or thoracodorsal fascia) is a complex, multilayer arrangement of fascial and aponeurotic layers forming a separation between the paraspinal muscles on one side, and the muscles of the posterior abdominal wall (quadratus lumborum, and psoas major) on the other. It spans the length of the back, extending between the neck superiorly and the sacrum inferiorly. It entails the fasciae and aponeuroses of the latissimus dorsi muscle, serratus posterior inferior muscle, abdominal internal oblique muscle, and transverse abdominal muscle.

In the lumbar region, it is known as lumbar fascia and here consists of 3 layers (posterior, middle, and anterior) enclosing two muscular compartments. In the thoracic region, it consists of a single layer (an upward extension of the posterior layer of the lumbar fascia). The thoracolumbar fascia is most prominent at its lower end where its various layers fuse into a thick composite.

== Anatomy ==
=== Thoracic region ===
In the thoracic region, the thoracolumbar fascia consists of a single layer - an upward extension of the posterior layer of the lumbar fascia, becoming progressively thinner before fading out above the 1st rib, replaced by the splenius muscle.

In the thoracic region, it forms a thin fibrous fascial covering for extensor muscles associated with the spine, separating them from muscles interconnecting the spine and upper extremity. Here it attaches to costal angles of all ribs, the spinous processes of all thoracic vertebrae, and the thoracic portion of the supraspinous ligament. It is situated deep to the serratus posterior superior muscle. Superiorly, it terminates by becoming continuous with the superficial layer of deep cervical fascia of the posterior neck.

=== Lumbar region ===
The thoracolumbar fascia is most prominent inferiorly - adjacent to the caudal lumbar spine, between the posterior superior iliac spines on either side - where its aponeurotic layers meld, forming a thickened sheet. The thickened, united inferior portion attaches firmly to the posterior superior iliac spine, and the sacrotuberous ligament. The thoracolumbar fascia extends as far inferiorly as the two ischial tuberotities.

== Function ==
The thoracolumbar fascia is thought to be involved in load transfer between the trunk and limb (it is tensioned by the action of the latissimus dorsi muscle, gluteus maximus muscle, and the hamstring muscles), and lifting.

It is endowed with nociceptive receptors, and may be involved in some forms of back pain.

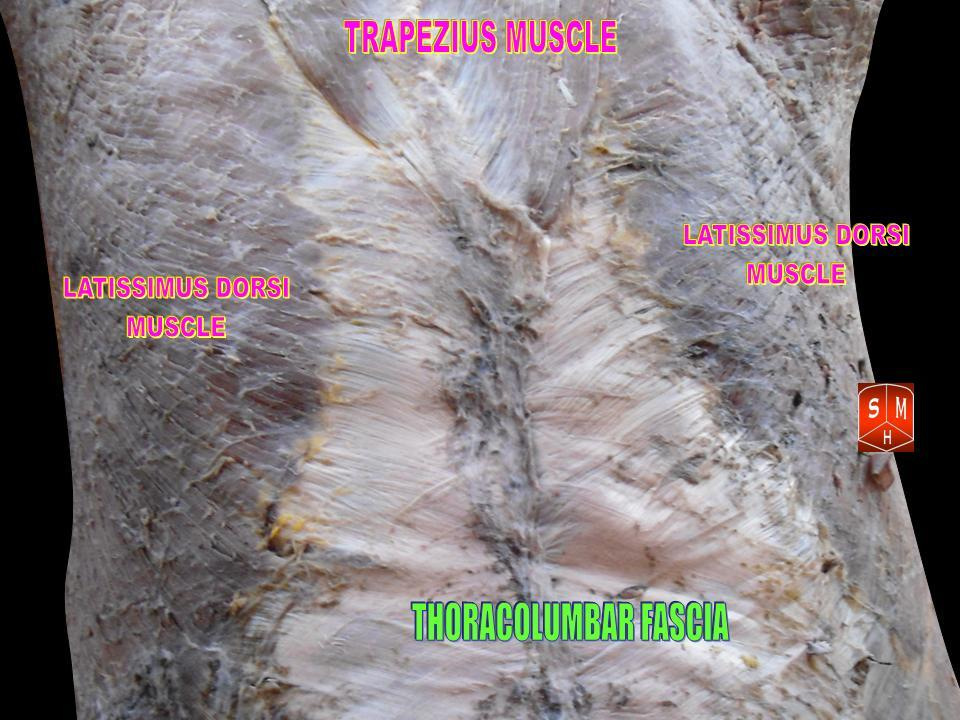
Thoracolumbar fascia

== See also ==
- Erector spinae muscles
