= List of Cincinnati Reds no-hitters =

The Cincinnati Reds are a Major League Baseball franchise based in Cincinnati. They play in the National League Central division. Also known in their early years as the "Cincinnati Red Stockings" (1882–1889) and "Cincinnati Redlegs" (1954–1959), pitchers for the Reds have thrown 17 no-hitters in franchise history. A no-hitter is officially recognized by Major League Baseball only "when a pitcher (or pitchers) allows no hits during the entire course of a game, which consists of at least nine innings", though one or more batters "may reach base via a walk, an error, a hit by pitch, a passed ball or wild pitch on strike three, or catcher's interference". No-hitters of less than nine complete innings were previously recognized by the league as official; however, several rule alterations in 1991 changed the rule to its current form.

A perfect game is a no-hitter of an even higher order of magnitude. As defined by Major League Baseball, "in a perfect game, no batter reaches any base during the course of the game." Tom Browning is the only Reds pitcher to have throw a perfect game in team history. He accomplished the feat on September 16, 1988, against the Los Angeles Dodgers at Cincinnati's Riverfront Stadium. Fierce rivals of the Reds in the 1970s, the Dodgers nonetheless went on to win the World Series only six weeks after Browning's perfect game against them.

While Dick Burns of the Outlaw Reds hurled the first no-hitter in Cincinnati baseball history, Bumpus Jones threw the first no-hitter in Reds history on October 15, 1892. The most recent no-hitter was thrown by Wade Miley on May 7, 2021. Six left-handed starting pitchers have thrown no-hitters in franchise history and the other seven pitchers were right-handed. Eleven Reds no-hitters were thrown at home and only five on the road. They threw two in April, three in May, four in June, three in July, one in August, two in September, and one in October. The longest interval between no-hitters in franchise history was between the games pitched by Browning and Bailey, encompassing over 24 years. Conversely, the shortest interval between no-hitters was a mere four days, between the two consecutive no-hitters pitched by Johnny Vander Meer, on June 11 and June 15, 1938. The team against whom the Reds have thrown the most no-hit games (three) is the Atlanta Braves (formerly "Boston Braves"), who were defeated by Vander Meer (first no-hitter in 1938), Clyde Shoun (in 1944), and Ewell Blackwell (in 1947). There are two no-hitters which the team allowed at least a run. The most baserunners allowed in a no-hitter was by Jim Maloney (in 1965), who allowed 11. Of the 16 no-hitters, the largest margin of victory in a Reds no-hitter was an 11–0 win by Ted Breitenstein in 1898. The smallest and most common margin of victory was 1–0, in wins by Fred Toney (1917), Shoun (1944), Maloney (1965), Browning (1988), and Bailey (2012).

The umpire is also an integral part of any no-hitter. The task of the umpire in a baseball game is to make any decision "which involves judgment, such as, but not limited to, whether a batted Ball is fair or foul, whether a pitch is a strike or a Ball, or whether a runner is safe or out… [the umpire's judgment on such matters] is final." Part of the duties of the umpire making calls at home plate includes defining the strike zone, which "is defined as that area over homeplate [sic] the upper limit of which is a horizontal line at the midpoint between the top of the shoulders and the top of the uniform pants, and the lower level is a line at the hollow beneath the kneecap." These calls define every baseball game and are therefore integral to the completion of any no-hitter. 14 different umpires presided over each of the Reds' 16 no-hitters.

The manager is another integral part of any no-hitter. The tasks of the manager is to determine the starting rotation as well as batting order and defensive lineup every game. Managers choosing the right pitcher and right defensive lineup at a right game at a right place at a right time would lead to a no-hitter. 12 different managers have led to the Reds' 16 no-hitters.

== List of no-hitters in Reds history ==
¶	Indicates a perfect game
£	Pitcher was left-handed
*	Member of the National Baseball Hall of Fame and Museum

#	Date	Pitcher	Final score	Base- runners	Opponent	Catcher	Plate umpire	Manager	Notes	Ref
1	October 15, 1892	Bumpus Jones	7–1	5	Pittsburgh Pirates	Ossee Schreck	Jack McQuaid	Charlie Comiskey	First career game; Final game of the season; First no-hitter in franchise history; First Reds no-hitter at home; First right-handed pitcher to throw a no-hitter in franchise history; First Reds no-hitter while allowing a run; Latest calendar date of Reds no-hitter	
2	April 22, 1898	Ted Breitenstein^{£}	11–0	3	Pittsburgh Pirates	Heinie Peitz (1)	Hank O'Day (1)	Buck Ewing	First left-handed pitcher to throw a no-hitter in franchise history; First of two on the same day; Largest margin of victory in a Reds no-hitter; Earliest calendar date of Reds no-hitter	
3	July 12, 1900	Noodles Hahn^{£}	4–0	1	Philadelphia Phillies	Heinie Peitz (2)	Adonis Terry	Bob Allen		
4	May 2, 1917	Fred Toney	1–0 (10)	1	@ Chicago Cubs	Ivey Wingo	Al Orth	Christy Mathewson	Smallest margin of victory in a Reds no-hitter (tie); Double no-hitter; First Reds no-hitter on the road	
5	May 11, 1919	Hod Eller	6–0	1	St. Louis Cardinals	Bill Rariden	Hank O'Day (2)	Pat Moran		
6	June 11, 1938	Johnny Vander Meer^{£} (1)	3–0	3	Boston Braves	Ernie Lombardi (1)	George Magerkurth	Bill McKechnie (1)	First of two no-hitters in back-to-back starts	
7	June 15, 1938	Johnny Vander Meer^{£} (2)	6–0	8	@ Brooklyn Dodgers	Ernie Lombardi (2)	Bill Stewart	Bill McKechnie (2)	Only pitcher in baseball history to throw two consecutive no-hitters; First-ever night game at Ebbets Field; Shortest interval between Reds no-hitters	
8	May 15, 1944	Clyde Shoun^{£}	1–0	1	Boston Braves	Ray Mueller	Beans Reardon	Bill McKechnie (3)	Smallest margin of victory in an Reds no-hitter (tie)	
9	June 18, 1947	Ewell Blackwell	6–0	4	Boston Braves	Ray Lamanno	Al Barlick	Johnny Neun	Against the Brooklyn Dodgers four days later, Blackwell nearly duplicated Vander Meer's double no-hit feat but had this bid broken up in the ninth	
10	August 19, 1965	Jim Maloney (1)	1–0 (10)	11	@ Chicago Cubs	Johnny Edwards	Mel Steiner	Dick Sisler	First game of a doubleheader; Smallest margin of victory in an Reds no-hitter (tie); Most baserunners allowed in a Reds no-hitter	
11	July 29, 1968	George Culver	6–1	8	@ Philadelphia Phillies	Pat Corrales	Harry Wendelstedt	Dave Bristol (1)	Second game of a doubleheader	
12	April 30, 1969	Jim Maloney (2)	10–0	5	Houston Astros	Johnny Bench	Frank Secory	Dave Bristol (2)	First game of a two-game series, in which both were no-hitters	
13	June 16, 1978	Tom Seaver*	4–0	4	St. Louis Cardinals	Don Werner	Terry Tata	Sparky Anderson	Seaver finally pitched a no-hitter after having two previous bids broken up in the ninth as a Met, including a perfect game bid in 1969	
14	September 16, 1988	Tom Browning^{£¶}	1–0	0	Los Angeles Dodgers	Jeff Reed	Jim Quick	Pete Rose	First and only perfect game in Reds history and 12th in MLB history; The Dodgers would go on to win the 1988 World Series	
15	September 28, 2012	Homer Bailey (1)	1–0	2	@ Pittsburgh Pirates	Ryan Hanigan (1)	Ed Hickox	Chris Speier	Smallest margin of victory in a Reds no-hitter (tie); Longest interval between Reds no-hitters	
16	July 2, 2013	Homer Bailey (2)	3–0	1	San Francisco Giants	Ryan Hanigan (2)	Adrian Johnson	Dusty Baker	Bailey becomes the sixth pitcher to have thrown both of MLB's two most recent no-hitters, following Nolan Ryan (twice, in June 1975 and September 1974 and in May and June 1973, Warren Spahn in April 1961 and September 1960, Allie Reynolds in September and July 1951, Johnny Vander Meer in June 1938 (see above), and Addie Joss in April 1910 and October 1908)	
17	May 7, 2021	Wade Miley^{£}	3–0	2	@ Cleveland Indians	Tucker Barnhart	Lance Barksdale	David Bell	Oldest Reds pitcher to throw a no-hitter (34 years, 175 days); First interleague no-hitter in franchise history	

== See also ==
- List of Major League Baseball no-hitters
