= Intercostal lymph nodes =

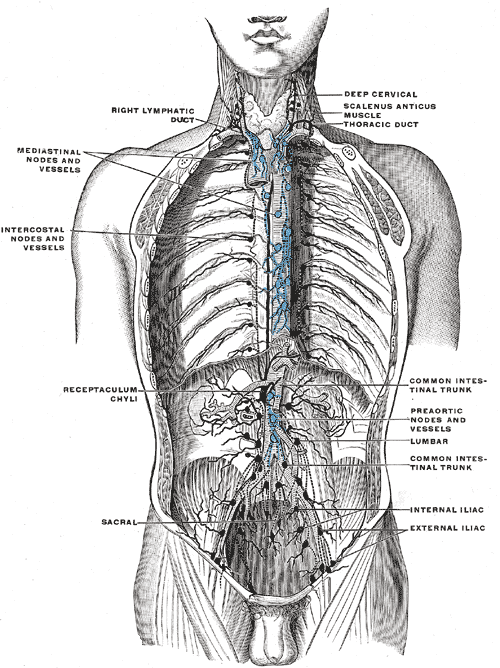
- Deep lymph nodes and vessels of the thorax and abdomen (diagrammatic). Afferent vessels are represented by continuous lines, and efferent and internodular vessels by dotted lines. (Intercostal nodes and vessels labeled at center left.)

Details
- System: Lymphatic system
- Drains to: Right lymphatic duct, thoracic duct

Identifiers
- Latin: nodi lymphoidei intercostales

The intercostal lymph nodes (intercostal glands) occupy the posterior parts of the intercostal spaces, in relation to the intercostal vessels.

They receive the deep lymphatics from the postero-lateral aspect of the chest; some of these vessels are interrupted by small lateral intercostal glands.

- The efferents of the glands in the lower four or five spaces unite to form a trunk, which descends and opens either into the cisterna chyli or into the commencement of the thoracic duct.
- The efferents of the glands in the upper spaces of the left side end in the thoracic duct; those of the corresponding right spaces, in the right lymphatic duct.
