= Intercostal muscles =

Muscle groups between the ribs which form and move the chest wall during breathing

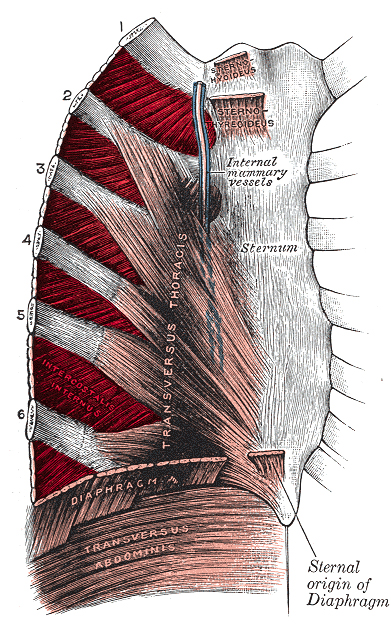
- Intercostal muscles highlighted in dark red.

Details
- Origin: Ribs 1–11
- Insertion: Ribs 2–12
- Artery: Intercostal arteries
- Nerve: Intercostal nerves
- Actions: Elevation or depression of the ribs

Identifiers
- Latin: musculi intercostales
- MeSH: D007366
- FMA: 13354

The intercostal muscles comprise many different groups of muscles that run between the ribs, and help form and move the chest wall. The intercostal muscles are mainly involved in the mechanical aspect of breathing by helping expand and shrink the size of the chest cavity.

== Structure ==
There are three principal layers:

1. External intercostal muscles also known as intercostalis externus aid in quiet and forced inhalation. They originate on ribs 1–11 and have their insertion on ribs 2–12. The external intercostals are responsible for the elevation of the ribs and bending them more open, thus expanding the transverse dimensions of the thoracic cavity. The muscle fibers are directed downwards, forwards and medially in the anterior part.
2. Internal intercostal muscles also known as intercostalis internus aid in forced expiration (quiet expiration is a passive process). They originate on ribs 2–12 and have their insertions on ribs 1–11. Their fibers pass anterior and superior from the upper margin of the rib and costal cartilage to the lower margin of the rib above. The internal intercostals are responsible for the depression of the ribs and bending them inward, thus decreasing the transverse dimensions of the thoracic cavity. The muscle fibers are directed downwards, backwards and laterally, perpendicular to the external intercostal muscles.
3. Innermost intercostal muscle also known as intercostalis intimus are deep layers of the internal intercostal muscles which are separated from them by a neurovascular bundle. The muscle fibers are directed downwards, backwards and laterally, the same way as the internal intercostal muscles.

=== Nerve supply ===
Both the external and internal muscles are innervated by the intercostal nerves (the ventral rami of thoracic spinal nerves), are supplied by the intercostal arteries, and are drained by the intercostal veins. Their fibers run in opposite directions.

== See also ==
- Thoracic diaphragm, another muscle importantly involved in respiratory action.
- Muscles of respiration
- Exhalation
- Inhalation
