= Intercostal nerve block =

Procedure for pain relief

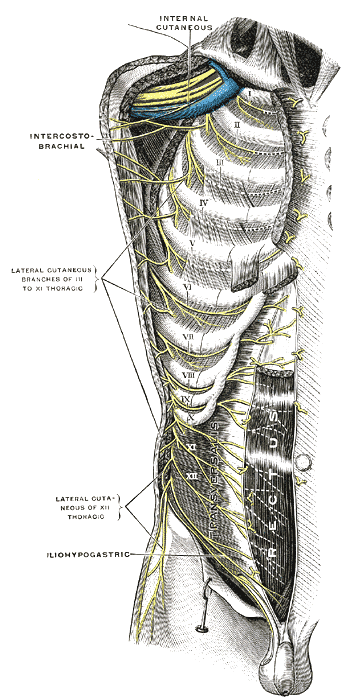
- Intercostal nerves with the superficial muscles removed
- ICD-9-CM: 04.81
- MeSH: D009407

Intercostal nerve block (abbreviated ICNB) is a nerve block which temporarily or permanently interrupts the flow of signals along an intercostal nerve, usually performed to relieve pain.

== Uses ==
An ICNB relieves the pain associated with injured intercostal nerves. This pain can arise from chest surgery, physical trauma, aggravation of the shingles virus, or pressure put upon the nerves during pregnancy.

== Techniques ==
=== Anesthetic nerve block ===
Injecting local pain relievers and steroids into the injured area alleviates intercostal nerve pain. In this type of nerve block, a needle inserted between two ribs releases a steroid into the area around the nerve. The exact location of injection depends on the underlying cause of the injury. After three to five days, the steroid begins to relieve pain. Depending on the individual, the pain-relieving effects of the steroid last for days to several months.

==== Risks ====
Injection without a device such as an ultrasound or fluoroscope to guide the needle can cause pneumothorax, a condition where air enters the cavity surrounding the lung or into a blood vessel causing local anesthetic toxicity. Other newer facial plane blocks may be an alternative option due to a preferential safety profile

=== Neurolysis ===
Physicians can also treat intercostal nerve pain by intentionally damaging the intercostal nerves. This process, known as neurolysis, prevents the nerves from sending pain signals. In chemical neurolysis, a needle injects alcohol or phenol into the nerve and prevents the conduction of pain signals. Neurolysis can also be accomplished through a process known as radio-frequency lesioning. In radio-frequency lesioning, a needle transmits radio waves to the nerve and interrupts regular pain signaling.

== Additional images ==
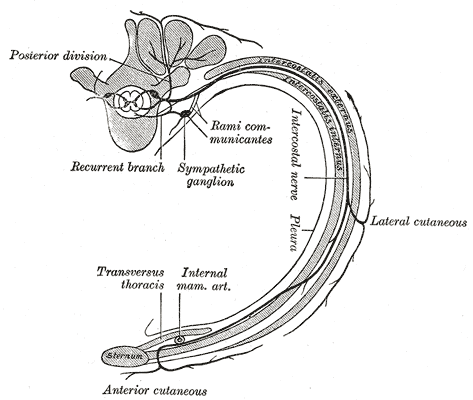
An intercostal nerve and its branches
