= Intercostal nerves =

Nerves in the thorax and abdomen

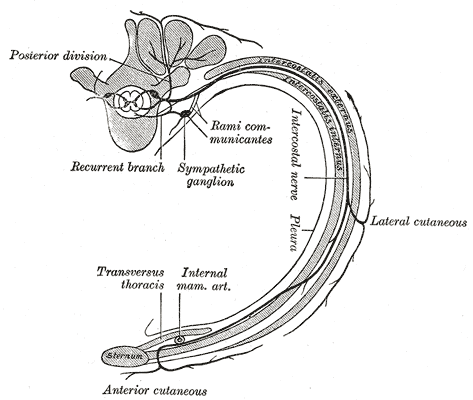
- Diagram of the course and branches of a typical intercostal nerve.

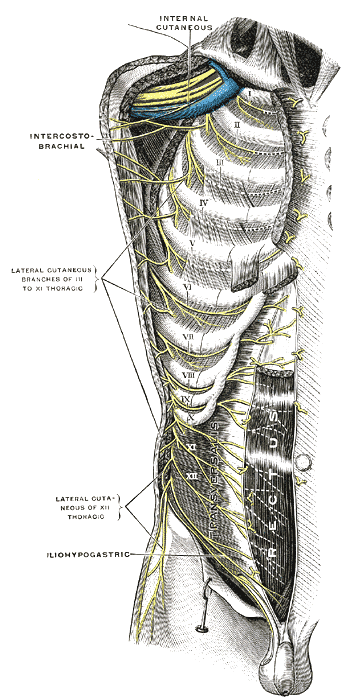
- Intercostal nerves, the superficial muscles having been removed.

Details
- From: Thoracic nerves (T1-T11)
- Innervates: Intercostal muscle

Identifiers
- Latin: nervi intercostales
- MeSH: D007367
- TA98: A14.2.04.006
- TA2: 6471
- FMA: 75467

The intercostal nerves are part of the somatic nervous system, and arise from the anterior rami of the thoracic spinal nerves from T1 to T11. The intercostal nerves are distributed chiefly to the thoracic pleura and abdominal peritoneum, and differ from the anterior rami of the other spinal nerves in that each pursues an independent course without plexus formation.

The first two nerves supply fibers to the upper limb and thorax; the next four distribute to the walls of the thorax; the lower five supply the walls of the thorax and abdomen. The 7th intercostal nerve ends at the xiphoid process of the sternum. The 10th intercostal nerve terminates at the navel. The 12th (subcostal) thoracic is distributed to the walls of the abdomen and groin. Each of these fibers contains around 1300 axons.

Unlike the nerves from the autonomic nervous system that innervate the visceral pleura of the thoracic cavity, the intercostal nerves arise from the somatic nervous system. This enables them to control the contraction of muscles, as well as provide specific sensory information regarding the skin and parietal pleura. This explains why damage to the internal wall of the thoracic cavity can be felt as a sharp pain localized in the injured region. Damage to the visceral pleura is experienced as an un-localized ache.

== The 1st thoracic nerve ==
The anterior division of the first thoracic nerve divides into two branches. The larger branch leaves the thorax in front of the neck of the first rib, and enters the brachial plexus. The smaller branch, the first intercostal nerve, runs along the first intercostal space, and ends on the front of the chest as the first anterior cutaneous branch of the thorax. Occasionally, this anterior cutaneous branch is missing.

The first intercostal nerve rarely gives off a lateral cutaneous branch; but sometimes sends a small branch to communicate with the intercostobrachial.

From the second thoracic nerve it frequently receives a connecting twig, which ascends over the neck of the second rib. This nerve was first described by Kuntz in 1927. There is considerable anatomic variation, but Kuntz nerve may be present in 40-80% of the population.

== The upper thoracic nerves: 2nd–6th ==
The anterior divisions of the second, third, fourth, fifth, and sixth thoracic nerves, and the small branch from the first thoracic, are confined to the walls of the thorax, and are named thoracic intercostal nerves.

They pass forward in the intercostal spaces below the intercostal vessels. At the back of the chest they lie between the pleura and the posterior intercostal membranes, but soon they run between the internal intercostals and the innermost intercostals then anteriorly they lie between the pleura and the internal intercostals.

Near the sternum, they cross in front of the internal mammary artery and transversus thoracis muscle, pierce the intercostales interni, the anterior intercostal membranes, and pectoralis major, and supply the integument of the front of the thorax and over the mammary gland, forming the anterior cutaneous branches of the thorax; the branch from the second nerve unites with the anterior supraclavicular nerves of the cervical plexus.

The fourth intercostal nerve is innervated by cutaneous slowly-adapting and rapidly-adapting mechanoreceptors, especially by ones densely-packed under the areola; innervation subsequently triggers oxytocin release, which, when in the peripheral bloodstream, causes myoepithelial cell contraction and lactation: this is an example of a non-nerve-innervation muscular reflex.

=== Branches ===
Numerous slender muscular filaments supply the Intercostales, the Subcostales, the Levatores costarum, the Serratus posterior superior, and the Transversus thoracis. At the front of the thorax some of these branches cross the costal cartilages from one intercostal space to another.

- Lateral cutaneous branches (rami cutanei laterales) are derived from the intercostal nerves, about midway between the vertebrae and sternum; they pierce the Intercostales externi and Serratus anterior, and divide into anterior and posterior branches.
- The anterior branches run forward to the side and the forepart of the chest and skin, fourth nerve anterior branches supplying the areola and the mamma; those of the fifth and sixth nerves supply the upper digitations of the Obliquus externus abdominis.
- The posterior branches run backward, and supply the skin over the scapula and Latissimus dorsi.

The lateral cutaneous branch of the second intercostal nerve does not divide, like the others, into an anterior and a posterior branch; it is named the intercostobrachial nerve.

== The lower thoracic nerves: 12th ==
=== Lateral cutaneous branch ===
The lateral cutaneous branch of the last thoracic nerve is large, and undivided.

It perforates the internal and the external oblique muscles, descends over the iliac crest in front of the lateral cutaneous branch of the iliohypogastric nerve, and is distributed to the skin of the front part of the gluteal muscles, some of its filaments extending as low as the greater trochanter of the femur.

== Additional images ==
Nervous system

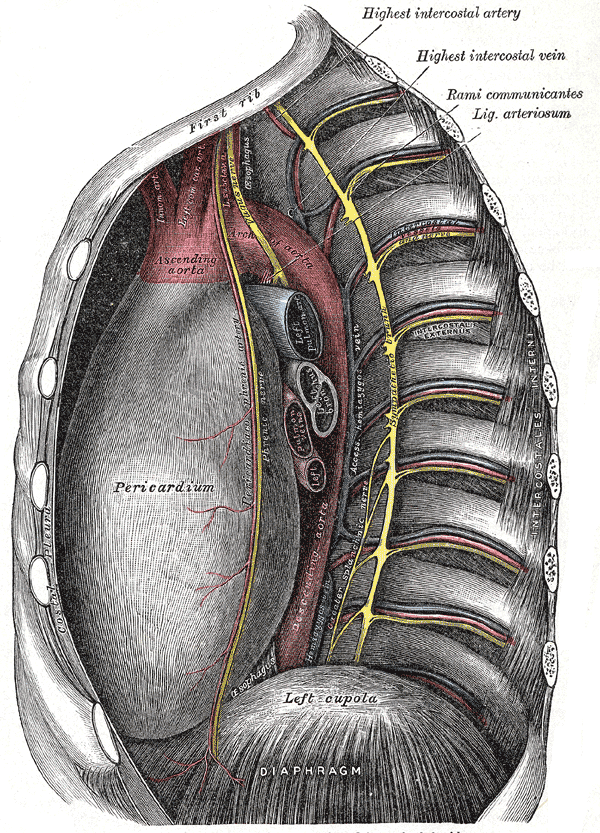
Intercostal spaces, viewed from the left

Brachial plexus

Brachial plexus with courses of spinal nerves shown

== See also ==
- Intercostal nerve block
- External intercostal muscles
- Internal intercostal muscles
- Peripheral nervous system
