= Subcostalis muscle =

Muscle of the rib

Details
- Origin: Inner surface of one rib
- Insertion: Inner surface of the second or third rib below, near its angle
- Nerve: Intercostal nerves
- Actions: Depress ribs

Identifiers
- Latin: musculus subcostalis
- TA98: A04.4.01.015
- TA2: 2314
- FMA: 71315

The subcostales (singular: subcostalis) (Infracostales) consist of muscular and aponeurotic fasciculi, which are usually well-developed only in the lower part of the thorax; each originates from the inner surface of one rib, and is inserted into the inner surface of the second or third rib below, near its angle.

Their fibers run in the same direction as those of the intercostales interni.

Depresses the ribs to assist in expiration.
