= Serratus posterior inferior muscle =

Muscle of the mid-low back

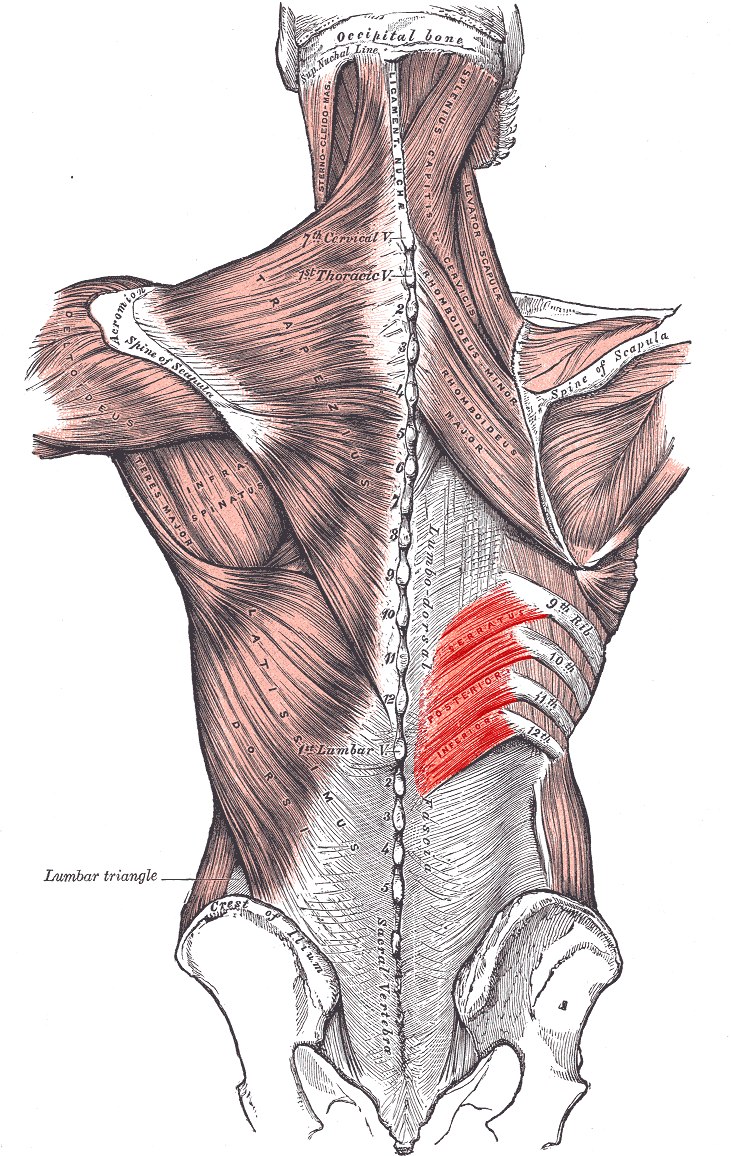
- Muscles connecting the upper extremity to the vertebral column (serratus posterior inferior labeled at center right).

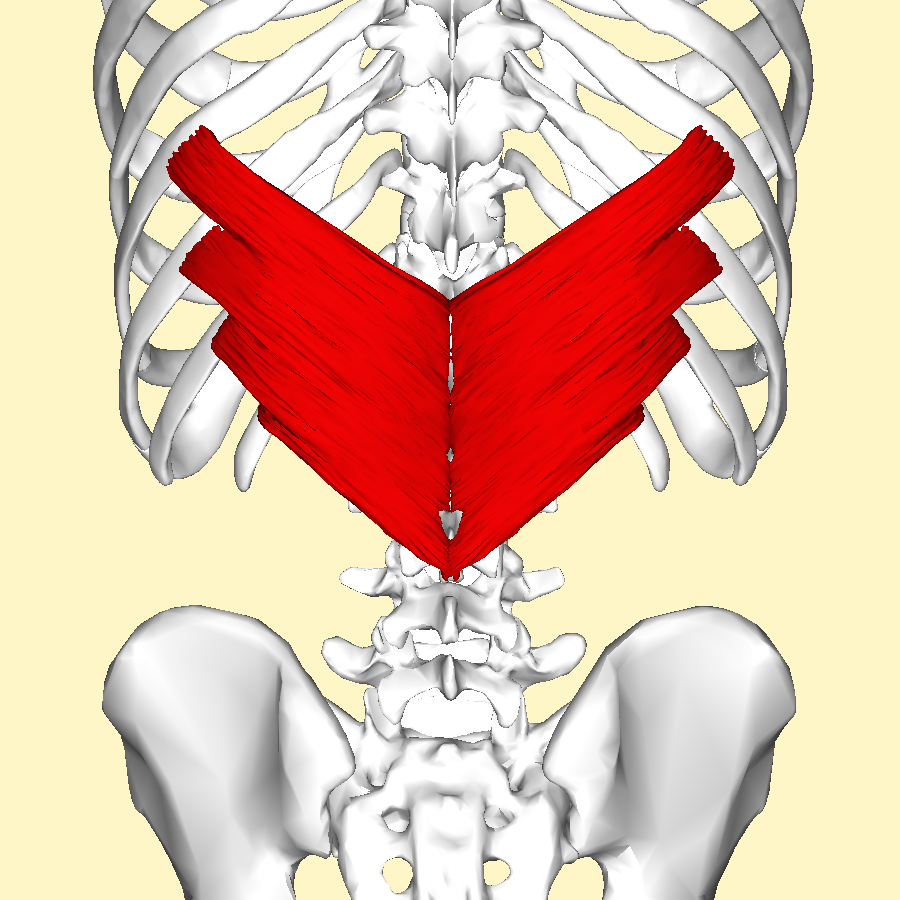
- Serratus posterior inferior (red) seen from back.

Details
- Origin: Vertebrae: Spinous processes of T11 - L2
- Insertion: The inferior borders of the 9th through 12th ribs
- Artery: Intercostal arteries
- Nerve: Intercostal nerves T9 through T12
- Actions: Depress the lower ribs 9-12, aiding in expiration

Identifiers
- Latin: musculus serratus posterior inferior
- TA98: A04.3.01.010
- TA2: 2235
- FMA: 13402

The serratus posterior inferior muscle, also known as the posterior serratus muscle, is a muscle of the human body.

== Structure ==
The muscle is situated at the junction of the thoracic and lumbar regions. It has an irregularly quadrilateral form, broader than the serratus posterior superior muscle, and separated from it by a wide interval.

It originates by a thin aponeurosis from the spinous processes of the lower two thoracic and upper two lumbar vertebrae.

Passing obliquely upward and lateralward, it becomes fleshy, and divides into four flat digitations. These are inserted into the inferior borders of the lower four ribs, a little beyond their angles.

The thin aponeurosis of origin is intimately blended with the thoracolumbar fascia, and aponeurosis of the latissimus dorsi muscle.

== Function ==
The serratus posterior inferior draws the lower ribs backward and downward to assist in rotation and extension of the trunk. This movement of the ribs may also contribute to inhalation and forced expiration of air from the lungs.

== Additional images ==
Position of the serratus posterior inferior (shown in red). Animation.

Close up. The muscle arises from the vertebrae T11 through L2 and inserted into lower border of the 9th through 12th ribs.

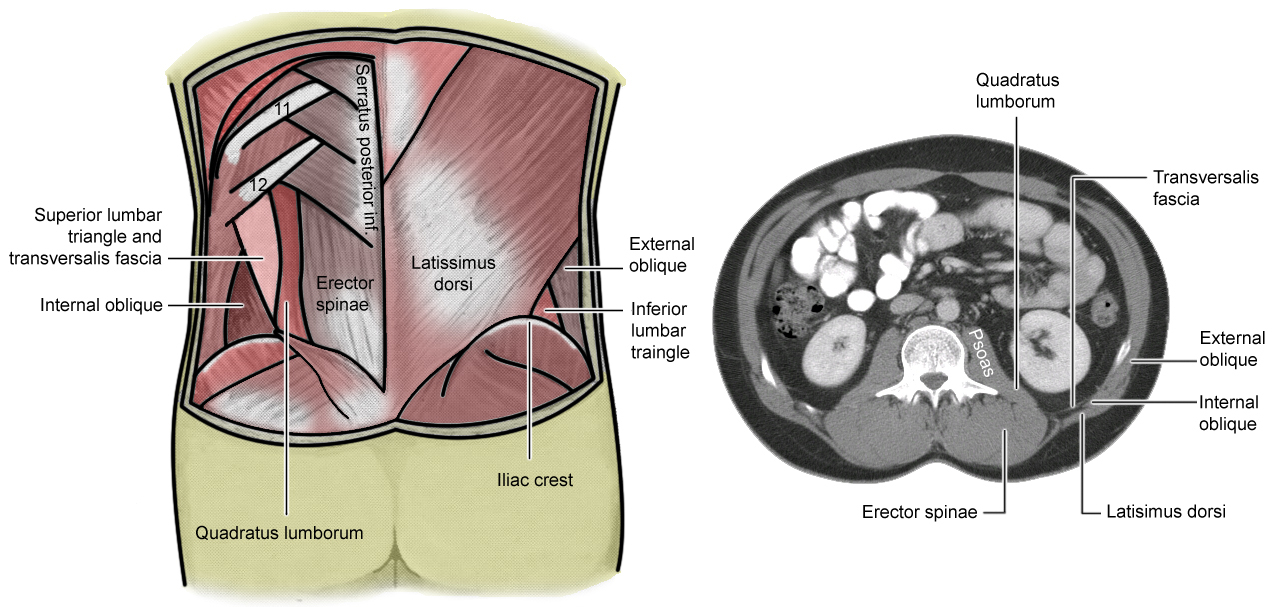
Lumbar triangle

== See also ==
- Serratus anterior muscle
- Serratus posterior superior muscle
