= Internal intercostal muscles =

Group of muscles between the ribs

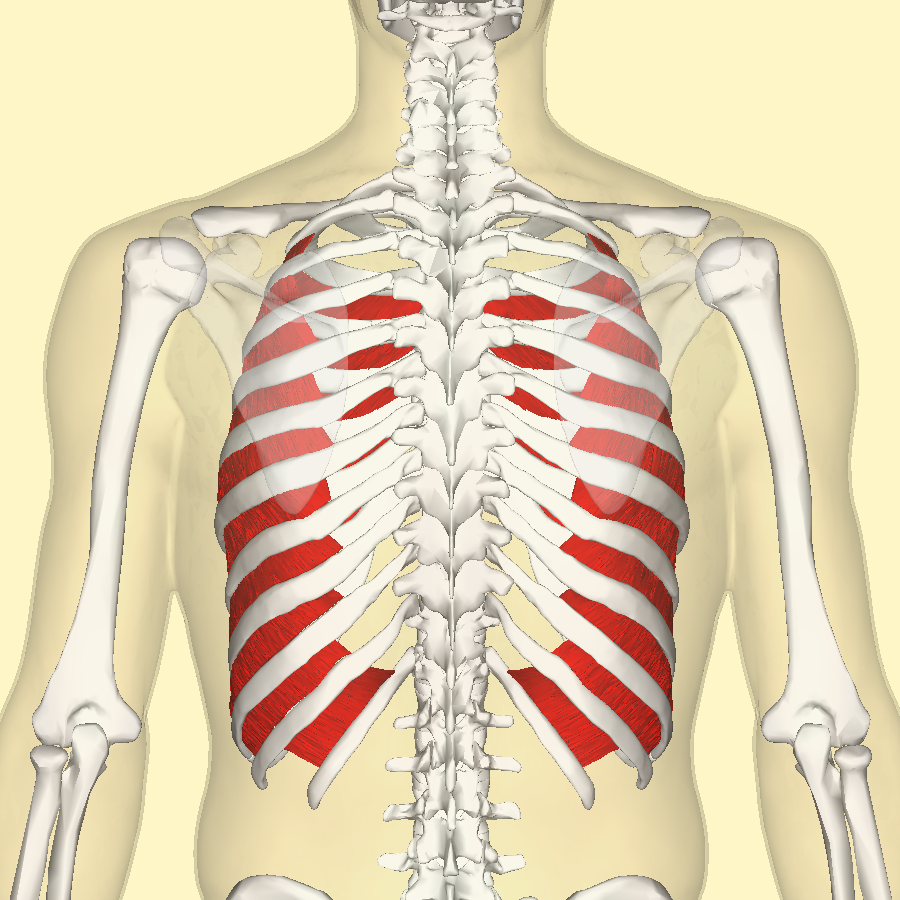
- Internal intercostal muscles (red) seen from back.

Details
- Origin: Rib - superior border
- Insertion: Rib - inferior border
- Artery: Intercostal arteries
- Nerve: Intercostal nerves
- Actions: Hold ribs steady
- Antagonist: External intercostal muscles

Identifiers
- Latin: musculi intercostales interni
- TA98: A04.4.01.013
- TA2: 2312
- FMA: 9757 74085, 9757

The internal intercostal muscles (intercostales interni) are a group of skeletal muscles located between the ribs. They are eleven in number on either side. They commence anteriorly at the sternum, in the intercostal spaces between the cartilages of the true ribs, and at the anterior extremities of the cartilages of the false ribs, and extend backward as far as the angles of the ribs, hence they are continued to the vertebral column by thin aponeuroses, the posterior intercostal membranes. They pull the sternum and ribs upward and inward.

== Structure ==
Their fibers are also directed obliquely, but pass in a direction opposite to those of the external intercostal muscles. The internal intercostal muscles originate from the costal groove of the rib and insert into the superior aspect of the rib below in a direction perpendicular to the external intercostal muscles. It is this arrangement that allows these muscles to facilitate exhalation.

For the most part, they are muscles of exhalation. In exhalation the interosseous portions of the internal intercostal muscles, (the part of the muscle that is between the bone portion of the superior and inferior ribs), depresses and retracts the ribs, compressing the thoracic cavity and expelling air. The internal intercostals, however, are only used in forceful exhalation such as coughing or during exercise and not in relaxed breathing. The external intercostal muscles, and the parasternal part of the internal intercostal muscles, (the part of the muscle that lies between the cartilage portion of the superior and inferior ribs), are used in inspiration, by aiding in elevating the ribs and expanding the thoracic cavity.

== Additional images ==
Position of internal intercostal muscles (red). Animation.

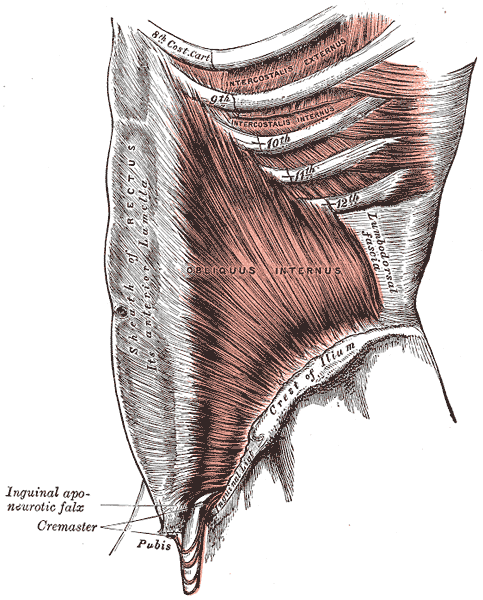
The obliquus internus abdominis.

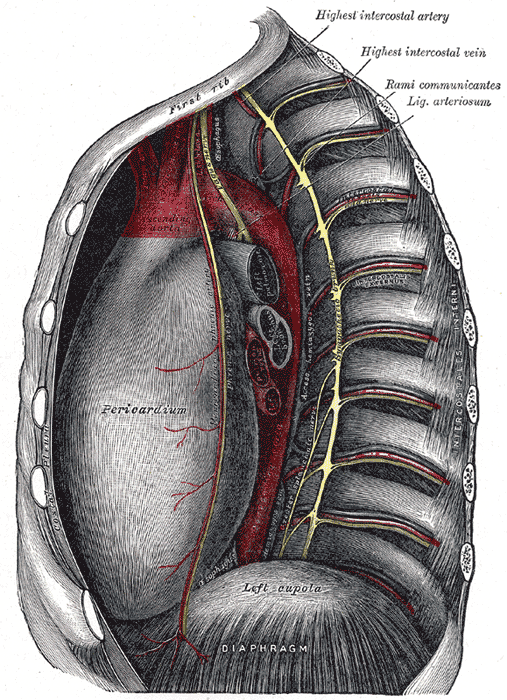
Thoracic portion of the sympathetic trunk.
