= Serratus posterior superior muscle =

Thin back muscle

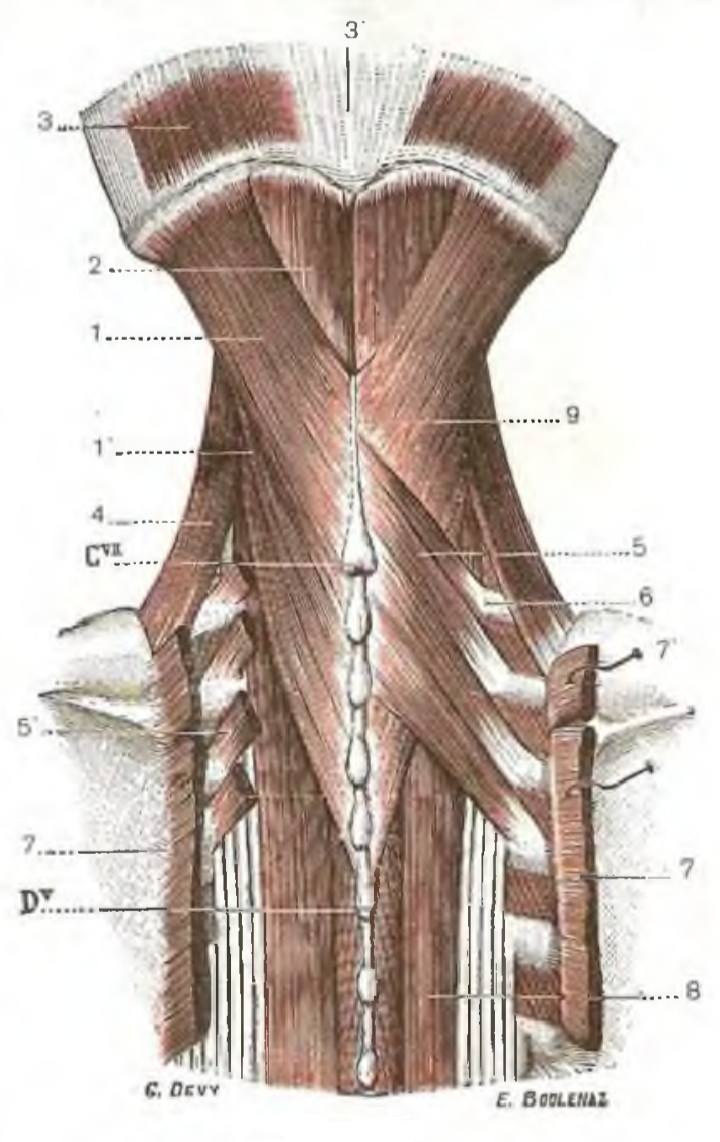
- Deep, posterior muscles of the neck. Right-sided serratus posterior superior is labeled 5. Left-sided serratus posterior superior is not depicted. (After Testut's Anatomy.)

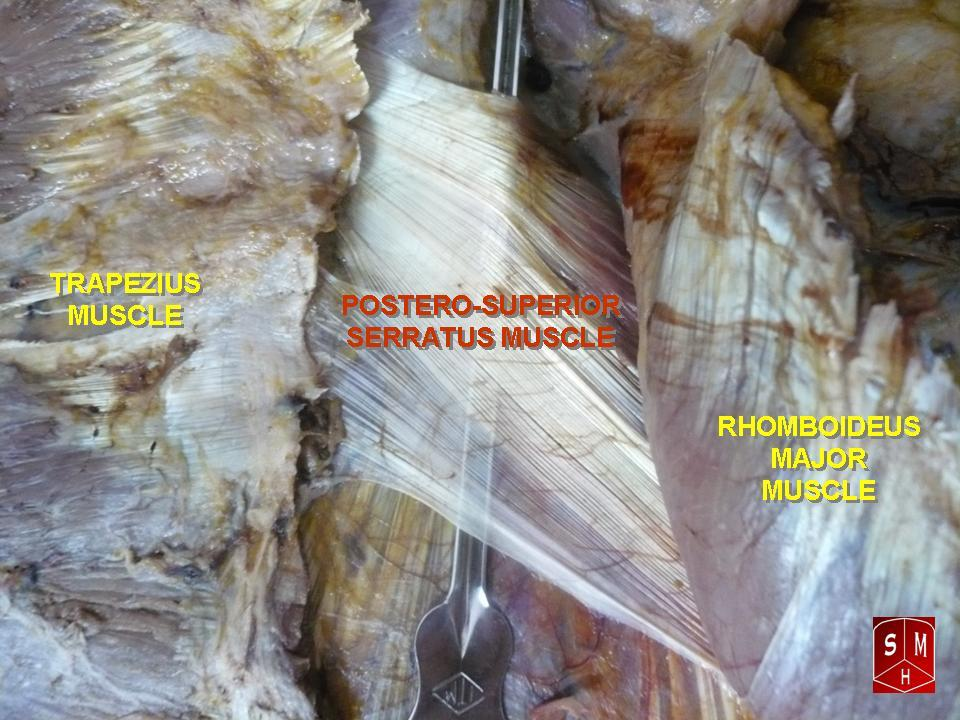
- Thin film-like object, at center, is serratus posterior superior muscle.

Details
- Origin: Nuchal ligament (or ligamentum nuchae) and the spinous processes of the vertebrae C7 through T3
- Insertion: The upper borders of the 2nd through 5th ribs
- Artery: Intercostal arteries
- Nerve: 2nd through 5th intercostal nerves
- Actions: Elevates ribs 2-5

Identifiers
- Latin: musculus serratus posterior superior or musculus serratus dorsalis cranialis
- TA98: A04.3.01.011
- TA2: 2236
- FMA: 13401

The serratus posterior superior muscle (or musculus serratus dorsalis cranialis) is a thin, quadrilateral muscle. It is situated at the upper back part of the thorax, deep to the rhomboid muscles.

== Structure ==
The serratus posterior superior muscle arises by an aponeurosis from the lower part of the nuchal ligament, from the spinous processes of C7, T1, T2 and T3, and from the supraspinal ligament. It is inserted, by four fleshy digitations into the upper borders of the second, third, fourth, and fifth ribs past the angle of the rib.

== Function ==
The serratus posterior superior muscle elevates the second to fifth ribs. This aids deep respiration.

== Additional images ==
Position of serratus posterior superior muscle (shown in red).

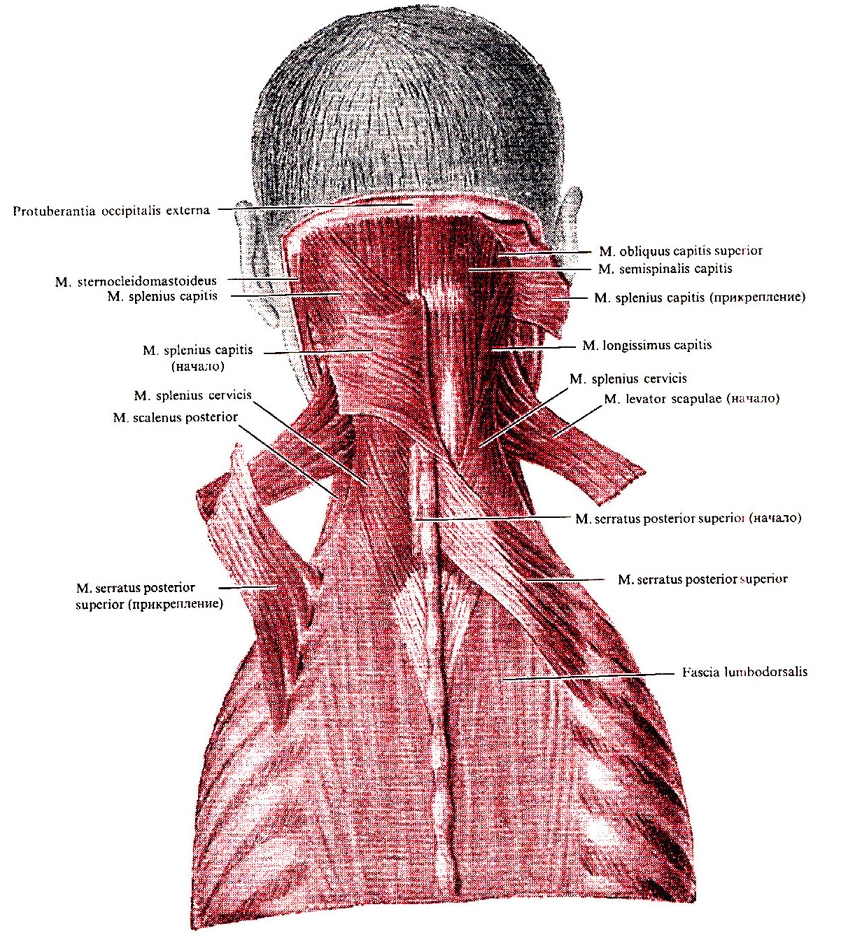
Serratus posterior superior muscles are labeled at center left and center right.

== See also ==
- Serratus anterior muscle
- Serratus posterior inferior muscle
